= List of swifts =

These 110 species of swifts (family Apodidae) are recognized by the International Ornithological Committee (IOC). They are distributed among four tribes and 19 genera. However, the family's taxonomy is not settled. The Clements taxonomy recognizes 109 species and BirdLife International's Handbook of the Birds of the World recognizes only 97..

== Tribe Cypseloidini ==
- Genus Cypseloides

- Spot-fronted swift (Cypseloides cherriei)
- White-chinned swift (Cypseloides cryptus)
- White-fronted swift (Cypseloides storeri)
- Sooty swift (Cypseloides fumigatus)
- Rothschild's swift (Cypseloides rothschildi)
- American black swift (Cypseloides niger)
- White-chested swift (Cypseloides lemosi)
- Great dusky swift (Cypseloides senex)

- Genus Streptoprocne

- Tepui swift (Streptoprocne phelpsi)
- Chestnut-collared swift (Streptoprocne rutila)
- White-collared swift (Streptoprocne zonaris)
- Biscutate swift (Streptoprocne biscutata)
- White-naped swift (Streptoprocne semicollaris)

== Tribe Collocaliini ==
- Genus Hydrochous

- Giant swiftlet (Hydrochous gigas)

- Genus Collocalia

- Plume-toed swiftlet (Collocalia affinis)
- Grey-rumped swiftlet (Collocalia marginata)
- Ridgetop swiftlet (Collocalia isonota)
- Tenggara swiftlet (Collocalia sumbawae)
- Drab swiftlet (Collocalia neglecta)
- Glossy swiftlet (Collocalia esculenta)
- Satin swiftlet (Collocalia uropygialis)
- Bornean swiftlet (Collocalia dodgei)
- Cave swiftlet (Collocalia linchi)
- Christmas swiftlet (Collocalia natalis)
- Pygmy swiftlet (Collocalia troglodytes)

- Genus Aerodramus

- Seychelles swiftlet (Aerodramus elaphrus)
- Mascarene swiftlet (Aerodramus francicus)
- Indian swiftlet (Aerodramus unicolor)
- Philippine swiftlet (Aerodramus mearnsi)
- Moluccan swiftlet (Aerodramus infuscatus)
- Mountain swiftlet (Aerodramus hirundinaceus)
- White-rumped swiftlet (Aerodramus spodiopygius)
- Australian swiftlet (Aerodramus terraereginae)
- Himalayan swiftlet (Aerodramus brevirostris)
- Volcano swiftlet (Aerodramus vulcanorum)
- Whitehead's swiftlet (Aerodramus whiteheadi)
- Bare-legged swiftlet (Aerodramus nuditarsus)
- Mayr's swiftlet (Aerodramus orientalis)
- Mossy-nest swiftlet (Aerodramus salangana)
- Uniform swiftlet (Aerodramus vanikorensis)
- Ameline swiftlet (Aerodramus amelis)
- Palau swiftlet (Aerodramus pelewensis)
- Mariana swiftlet (Aerodramus bartschi)
- Caroline swiftlet (Aerodramus inquietus)
- Tahiti swiftlet (Aerodramus leucophaeus)
- Atiu swiftlet (Aerodramus sawtelli)
- Marquesan swiftlet (Aerodramus ocistus)
- Black-nest swiftlet (Aerodramus maximus)
- Edible-nest swiftlet (Aerodramus fuciphagus)
- Three-toed swiftlet (Aerodramus papuensis)

- Genus Schoutedenapus

- Scarce swift (Schoutedenapus myoptilus)

== Tribe Chaeturini ==
- Genus Mearnsia

- Philippine spinetail (Mearnsia picina)
- Papuan spinetail (Mearnsia novaeguineae)

- Genus Zoonavena

- Madagascar spinetail (Zoonavena grandidieri)
- Sao Tome spinetail (Zoonavena thomensis)
- White-rumped spinetail (Zoonavena sylvatica)

- Genus Telacanthura

- Mottled spinetail (Telacanthura ussheri)
- Black spinetail (Telacanthura melanopygia)

- Genus Rhaphidura

- Silver-rumped spinetail (Rhaphidura leucopygialis)
- Sabine's spinetail (Rhaphidura sabini)

- Genus Neafrapus

- Cassin's spinetail (Neafrapus cassini)
- Böhm's spinetail (Neafrapus boehmi)

- Genus Hirundapus

- White-throated needletail (Hirundapus caudacutus)
- Silver-backed needletail (Hirundapus cochinchinensis)
- Brown-backed needletail (Hirundapus giganteus)
- Purple needletail (Hirundapus celebensis)

- Genus Chaetura

- Grey-rumped swift (Chaetura cinereiventris)
- Band-rumped swift (Chaetura spinicaudus)
- Lesser Antillean swift (Chaetura martinica)
- Costa Rican swift (Chaetura fumosa)
- Pale-rumped swift (Chaetura egregia)
- Chimney swift (Chaetura pelagica)
- Vaux's swift (Chaetura vauxi)
- Chapman's swift (Chaetura chapmani)
- Ashy-tailed swift (Chaetura andrei)
- Sick's swift (Chaetura meridionalis)
- Short-tailed swift (Chaetura brachyura)

== Tribe Apodini ==
- Genus Aeronautes

- White-throated swift (Aeronautes saxatalis)
- White-tipped swift (Aeronautes montivagus)
- Andean swift (Aeronautes andecolus)

- Genus Tachornis

- Antillean palm swift (Tachornis phoenicobia)
- Pygmy palm swift (Tachornis furcata)
- Fork-tailed palm swift (Tachornis squamata)

- Genus Panyptila

- Great swallow-tailed swift (Panyptila sanctihieronymi)
- Lesser swallow-tailed swift (Panyptila cayennensis)

- Genus Cypsiurus

- African palm swift (Cypsiurus parvus)
- Malagasy palm swift (Cypsiurus gracilis)
- Asian palm swift (Cypsiurus balasiensis)

- Genus Tachymarptis

- Alpine swift (Tachymarptis melba)
- Mottled swift (Tachymarptis aequatorialis)

- Genus Apus

- Cape Verde swift (Apus alexandri)
- Common swift (Apus apus)
- Plain swift (Apus unicolor)
- Nyanza swift (Apus niansae)
- Pallid swift (Apus pallidus)
- African black swift (Apus barbatus)
- Malagasy black swift (Apus balstoni)
- Fernando Po swift (Apus sladeniae)
- Forbes-Watson's swift (Apus berliozi)
- Bradfield's swift (Apus bradfieldi)
- Pacific swift (Apus pacificus)
- Salim Ali's swift (Apus salimalii)
- Blyth's swift (Apus leuconyx)
- Cook's swift (Apus cooki)
- Dark-rumped swift (Apus acuticauda)
- Little swift (Apus affinis)
- House swift (Apus nipalensis)
- Horus swift (Apus horus)
- White-rumped swift (Apus caffer)
- Bates's swift (Apus batesi)
