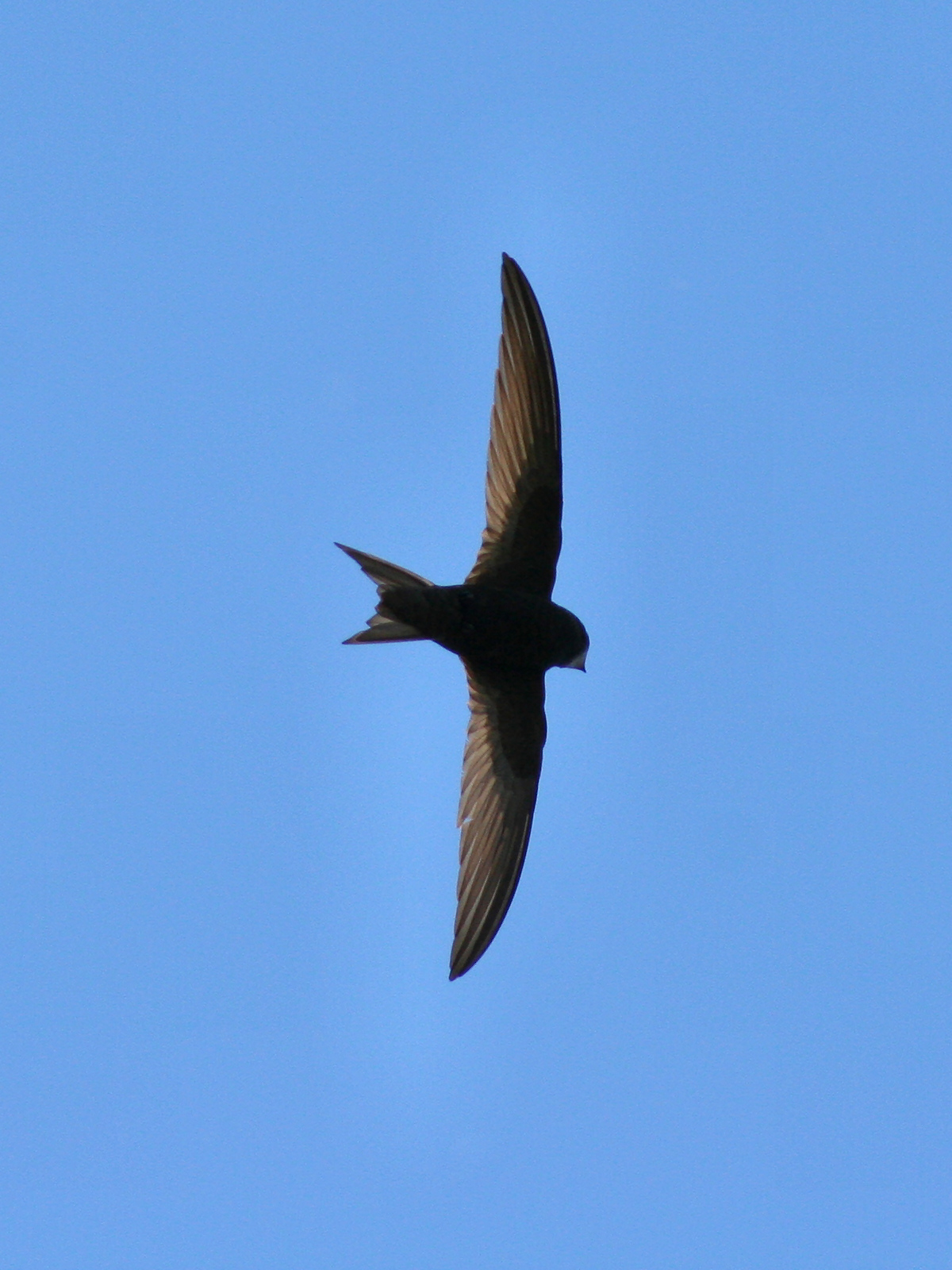
- Common swift, Apus apus

Scientific classification
- Domain: Eukaryota
- Kingdom: Animalia
- Phylum: Chordata
- Class: Aves
- Clade: Strisores
- Order: Apodiformes
- Family: Apodidae
- Subfamily: Apodinae

Tribe
- Collocaliini; Chaeturini; Apodini

= Apodinae =

Subfamily of birds

The Apodinae are a subfamily of swifts and contain the following species:

Tribe Collocaliini - swiftlets

- Genus Collocalia

- Plume-toed swiftlet (Collocalia affinis)
- Grey-rumped swiftlet (Collocalia marginata)
- Ridgetop swiftlet (Collocalia isonota)
- Tenggara swiftlet (Collocalia sumbawae)
- Drab swiftlet (Collocalia neglecta)
- Glossy swiftlet (Collocalia esculenta)

Subspecies: C. e. affinis, C. e. elachyptera, C. e. cyanoptila, C. e. vanderbilti, C. e. oberholseri,
C. e. natalis, C. e. septentrionalis, C. e. isonota, C. e. marginata, C. e. bagobo, C. e. spilura,
C. e. manadensis, C. e. esculenta, C. e. minuta, C. e. sumbawae, C. e. perneglecta, C. e. neglecta,
C. e. amethystina, C. e. erwini, C. e. numforensis, C. e. nitens, C. e. misimae, C. e. stresemanni,
C. e. heinrothi, C. e. spilogaster, C. e. tametamele, C. e. becki, C. e. makirensis, C. e. desiderata,
C. e. uropygialis, & C. e. albidior

- Satin swiftlet (Collocalia uropygialis)
- Bornean swiftlet (Collocalia dodgei)
- Cave swiftlet (Collocalia linchi)

Subspecies: C. l. ripleyi, C. l. dodgei, C. l. linchi, & C. l. dedii

- Christmas Island swiftlet (Collocalia natalis)
- Pygmy swiftlet (Collocalia troglodytes)

- Genus Aerodramus sometimes included in Collocalia

- Seychelles swiftlet (Aerodramus elaphrus)
- Mascarene swiftlet (Aerodramus francicus)
- Indian swiftlet (Aerodramus unicolor)
- Philippine swiftlet (Aerodramus mearnsi)
- Moluccan swiftlet (Aerodramus infuscatus)

Subspecies: A. i. sororum, A. i. infuscatus, & A. i. ceramensis

- Sulawesi swiftlet (Aerodramus sororum)
- Seram swiftlet (Aerodramus ceramensis)
- Mountain swiftlet (Aerodramus hirundinaceus)

Subspecies: A. h. baru, A. h. excelsus, & A. h. hirundinaceus

- White-rumped swiftlet (Aerodramus spodiopygius)

Subspecies: A. s. delichon, A. s. eichhorni, A. s. noonaedanae, A. s. reichenowi, A. s. desolatus,
A. s. epiensis, A. s. ingens, A. s. leucopygius, A. s. assimilis, A. s. townsendi, & A. s. spodiopygius

- Australian swiftlet (Aerodramus terraereginae)

Subspecies: A. t. terraereginae, & A. t. chillagoensis

- Himalayan swiftlet (Aerodramus brevirostris)

Subspecies: A. b. brevirostris, A. b. innominatus, & A. b. rogersi

- Indochinese swiftlet (Aerodramus rogersi) sometimes included in A. brevirostris
- Volcano swiftlet (Aerodramus vulcanorum) sometimes included in A. brevirostris
- Whitehead's swiftlet (Aerodramus whiteheadi)

Subspecies: A. w. whiteheadi, & A. w. origenis

- Bare-legged swiftlet (Aerodramus nuditarsus)
- Mayr's swiftlet (Aerodramus orientalis)

Subspecies: A. o. leletensis, & A. o. orientalis

- Palawan swiftlet (Aerodramus palawanensis)
- Mossy-nest swiftlet (Aerodramus salangana) sometimes included in A. vanikorensis

Subspecies: A. s. natunae, A. s. maratua, A. s. aerophilus, & A. s. salangana

- Uniform swiftlet (Aerodramus vanikorensis)

Subspecies: A. v. amelis, A. v. palawanensis, A. v. aenigma, A. v. heinrichi, A. v. moluccarum,
A. v. waigeuensis, A. v. steini, A. v. yorki, A. v. tagulae, A. v. coultasi, A. v. pallens, A. v. lihirensis,
A. v. lugubris, & A. v. vanikorensis

- Palau swiftlet (Aerodramus pelewensis)
- Mariana swiftlet (Aerodramus bartschi)
- Island swiftlet (Aerodramus inquietus)

Subspecies: A. i. rukensis, A. i. ponapensis, & A. i. inquietus

- Atiu swiftlet (Aerodramus sawtelli)
- Tahiti swiftlet (Aerodramus leucophaeus)

Subspecies: A. l. leucophaeus, A. l. ocistus, & A. l. gilliardi

- Marquesan swiftlet (Aerodramus ocistus)
- Black-nest swiftlet (Aerodramus maximus)

Subspecies: A. m. maximus, A. m. lowi, & A. m. tichelmani

- Edible-nest swiftlet (Aerodramus fuciphagus)

Subspecies: A. f. amechanus, A. f. germani, A. f. inexpectatus, A. f. vestitus, A. f. perplexus,
A. f. fuciphagus, A. f. dammermani, & A. f. micans

- Germain's swiftlet (Aerodramus germani)
- Three-toed swiftlet (Aerodramus papuensis)

- Genus Hydrochous

- Giant swiftlet (Hydrochous gigas)

- Genus Schoutedenapus - African swiftlets

- Scarce swift (Schoutedenapus myoptilus)

Subspecies: S. m. poensis, S. m. chapini, & S. m. myoptilus

Tribe Chaeturini - needletails

- Genus Mearnsia

- Philippine spinetail (Mearnsia picina)
- Papuan spinetail (Mearnsia novaeguineae)

Subspecies: M. n. buergersi, & M. n. novaeguineae

- Genus Zoonavena

- Madagascar spinetail (Zoonavena grandidieri)

Subspecies: Z. g. grandidieri, & Z. g. mariae

- São Tomé spinetail (Zoonavena thomensis)
- White-rumped spinetail (Zoonavena sylvatica)

- Genus Telacanthura

- Black spinetail (Telacanthura melanopygia)
- Mottled spinetail (Telacanthura ussheri)

Subspecies: T. u. ussheri, T. u. sharpei, T. u. stictilaema, & T. u. benguellensis

- Genus Rhaphidura

- Silver-rumped spinetail (Rhaphidura leucopygialis)
- Sabine's spinetail (Rhaphidura sabini)

- Genus Neafrapus

- Böhm's spinetail (Neafrapus boehmi)

Subspecies: N. b. boehmi, & N. b. sheppardi

- Cassin's spinetail (Neafrapus cassini)

- Genus Hirundapus

- White-throated needletail (Hirundapus caudacutus)

Subspecies: H. c. caudacutus, & H. c. nudipes

- Purple needletail (Hirundapus celebensis)
- Silver-backed needletail (Hirundapus cochinchinensis)

Subspecies: H. c. rupchandi, H. c. cochinchinensis, & H. c. formosanus

- Brown-backed needletail (Hirundapus giganteus)

Subspecies: H. g. indicus, & H. g. giganteus

- Genus Chaetura

- Band-rumped swift (Chaetura spinicauda)

Subspecies: C. s. aetherodroma, & C. s. spinicaudus

- Lesser Antillean swift (Chaetura martinica)
- Gray-rumped swift (Chaetura cinereiventris)

Subspecies: C. c. phaeopygos, C. c. occidentalis, C. c. schistacea, C. c. lawrencei, C. c. guianensis,
C. c. sclateri, & C. c. cinereiventris

- Pale-rumped swift (Chaetura egregia)
- Chimney swift (Chaetura pelagica)
- Vaux's swift (Chaetura vauxi)

Subspecies: C. v. vauxi, C. v. tamaulipensis, C. v. gaumeri, C. v. warneri, C. v. richmondi,
C. v. ochropygia, & C. v. andrei

- Chapman's swift (Chaetura chapmani)
- Mato Grosso swift (Chaetura viridipennis)
- Short-tailed swift (Chaetura brachyura)

Subspecies: C. b. brachyura, C. b. praevelox, C. b. cinereocauda, & C. b. ocypetes

- Sick's swift (Chaetura meridionalis)
- Costa Rican swift (Chaetura fumosa)

Tribe Apodini - typical swifts

- Genus Aeronautes

- White-throated swift (Aeronautes saxatalis)

Subspecies: A. s. saxatalis, & A. s. nigrior

- White-tipped swift (Aeronautes montivagus)

Subspecies: A. m. montivagus, & A. m. tatei

- Andean swift (Aeronautes andecolus)

Subspecies: A. a. parvulus, A. a. peruvianus, & A. a. andecolus

- Genus Tachornis

- Pygmy palm swift (Tachornis furcata)

Subspecies: T. f. nigrodorsalis, & T. f. furcata

- Fork-tailed palm swift (Tachornis squamata)

Subspecies: T. s. semota, & T. s. squamata

- Antillean palm-swift (Tachornis phoenicobia)

Subspecies: T. p. iradii, & T. p. phoenicobia

- Genus Panyptila

- Great swallow-tailed swift (Panyptila sanctihieronymi)
- Lesser swallow-tailed swift (Panyptila cayennensis)

Subspecies: P. c. veraecrucis, & P. c. cayennensis

- Genus Cypsiurus

- Asian palm swift (Cypsiurus balasiensis)

Subspecies: C. b. balasiensis, C. b. infumatus, C. b. bartelsorum, & C. b. pallidior

- African palm swift (Cypsiurus parvus)

Subspecies: C. p. parvus, C. p. brachypterus, C. p. myochrous, C. p. laemostigma, C. p. hyphaenes,
C. p. celer, & C. p. gracilis

- Malagasy palm swift (Cypsiurus gracilis)

Subspecies: C. g. gracilis, C. g. griveaudi

- Genus Tachymarptis

- Alpine swift (Tachymarptis melba)

Subspecies: T. m. melba, T. m. tuneti, T. m. archeri, T. m. maximus, T. m. africanus, T. m. marjoriae,
T. m. willsi, T. m. nubifugus, T. m. dorabtatai, & T. m. bakeri

- Mottled swift (Tachymarptis aequatorialis)

Subspecies: T. a. lowei, T. a. bamendae, T. a. furensis, T. a. aequatorialis, & T. a. gelidus

- Genus Apus

- Cape Verde swift (Apus alexandri)
- Common swift (Apus apus)

Subspecies: A. a. apus, & A. a. pekinensis

- Plain swift (Apus unicolor)
- Nyanza swift (Apus niansae)

Subspecies: A. n. niansae, & A. n. somalicus

- Pallid swift (Apus pallidus)

Subspecies: A. p. brehmorum, A. p. illyricus, & A. p. pallidus

- African black swift (Apus barbatus)

Subspecies: A. b. glanvillei, A. b. serlei, A. b. roehli, A. b. hollidayi, A. b. oreobates,
& A. b. barbatus

- Forbes-Watson's swift (Apus berliozi)

Subspecies: A. b. berliozi, & A. b. bensoni

- Bradfield's swift (Apus bradfieldi)

Subspecies: A. b. bradfieldi, & A. b. deserticola

- Malagasy black swift (Apus balstoni)

Subspecies: A. b. mayottensis, & A. b. balstoni

- Pacific swift (Apus pacificus)

Subspecies: A. p. pacificus, A. p. kurodae, A. p. salimali, A. p. leuconyx, & A. p. cooki

- Salim Ali's swift (Apus salimalii)
- Blyth's swift (Apus leuconyx)
- Cook's swift (Apus cooki)
- Dark-rumped swift (Apus acuticauda)
- Little swift (Apus affinis)

Subspecies: A. a. galilejensis, A. a. aerobates, A. a. bannermani, A. a. theresae, A. a. affinis,
& A. a. singalensis

- House swift (Apus nipalensis)

Subspecies: A. n. nipalensis, A. n. subfurcatus, A. n. furcatus, & A. n. kuntzi

- Horus swift (Apus horus)

Subspecies: A. h. horus, & A. h. fuscobrunneus

- White-rumped swift (Apus caffer)
- Bates's swift (Apus batesi)
- Fernando Po swift (Apus sladeniae)
