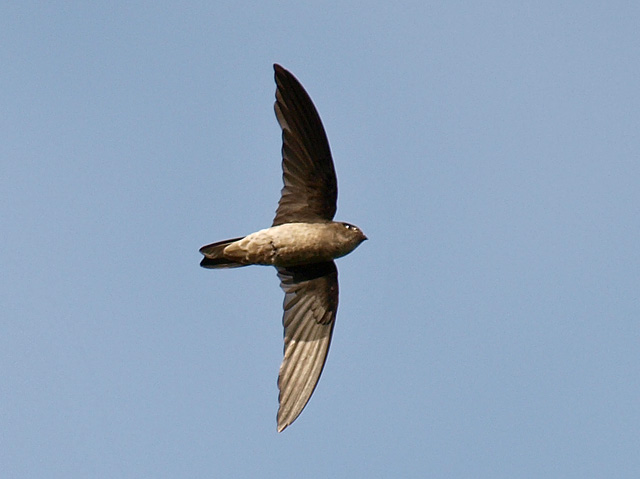
- Black-nest swiftlet

Scientific classification
- Kingdom: Animalia
- Phylum: Chordata
- Class: Aves
- Order: Apodiformes
- Family: Apodidae
- Subfamily: Apodinae
- Tribe: Collocaliini

Genera
- Aerodramus; Collocalia; Hydrochous; Schoutedenapus

= Swiftlet =

Swiftlets

Tribe of birds in the swift family

Swiftlets are birds from the four genera Aerodramus, Collocalia, Hydrochous and Schoutedenapus, which form the tribe Collocaliini within the swift family Apodidae. The group contains around thirty species mostly confined to southern Asia, south Pacific islands, and northeastern Australia, all within the tropical and subtropical regions. They are in many respects typical members of the Apodidae, having narrow wings for fast flight, with a wide gape and small reduced beak surrounded by bristles for catching insects in flight. What distinguishes many but not all species from other swifts and indeed almost all other birds is their ability to use a simple but effective form of echolocation to navigate in total darkness through the chasms and shafts of the caves where they roost at night and breed.

The nests of some species are built entirely from solidified threads of their saliva, which are edible and thus collected for human consumption as the famous Chinese delicacy, the bird's nest soup.

== Description and ecology ==
The swift family remains one of the more complicated groups of birds in taxonomic research, but the swiftlet tribe is a rather well-defined group. Its internal systematics is confusing; the plumage is usually dull, with shades of black, brown, and gray; from their outward appearance, most species are very similar. Swiftlets have four toes, except the Papuan swiftlet which lacks the hallux (back toe). Their legs are very short, preventing the birds from perching, but allowing them to cling to vertical surfaces. Flight is mainly gliding due to very long primary feathers and small breast muscles. The larger Aerodramus swiftlets weigh about 14 grams and are 10 cm long.

Swiftlets are insectivores; hymenopterans and dipterans being the most abundant prey. Typically, they leave the cave during the day to forage and return to their roost at night. Males and females look similar; as usual in such cases, these birds are monogamous and both partners take part in caring for the nestlings. Males perform aerial displays to attract females and mating occurs at the nest. The breeding season overlaps the wet season, which corresponds to an increased insect population. Clutch size depends on the location and the food source, but it is generally not large; Aerodramus swiftlets lay 1 to 2 eggs. The eggs are a dull white color and are laid every other day. Many if not all species are colonial nesters; some build their nests in high, dark corners on cave walls. Swiftlets in temperate zones do migrate, but most Aerodramus swiftlets live in the tropical Indo-Pacific region and do not migrate. These birds usually remain in one cave or other roosting/nesting site. Some examples of caves include the Niah Caves at Niah National Park & Gunung Mulu National Park which are all located in Sarawak, Malaysian Borneo.

The genus Aerodramus is of special interest due to its use of echolocation and its intricately constructed saliva nests which in some species contain no other material such as feathers, moss or twigs and are collected, selling at extremely high prices (see Bird's nest soup). It has been argued that the high demand for these nests could have had an adverse effect on their populations, but other authorities have shown that modern techniques of nest farming have increased the bird population.

The use of echolocation was once used to separate Aerodramus from the non-echolocating genera Collocalia and Hydrochous (virtually nothing is known about Schoutedenapus). But recently, the pygmy swiftlet Collocalia troglodytes was discovered making similar clicking noises in and outside its cave. Characteristics of behavior, such as what materials other than saliva the nests contain, can be used to differentiate between certain species of Aerodramus.

== Echolocation ==
The genus Aerodramus was thought to be the only echolocating swiftlets. These birds use echolocation to locate their roost in dark caves. Unlike a bat's echolocation, Aerodramus swiftlets make clicking noises that are well within the human range of hearing. The clicks consist of two broad band pulses (3–10 kHz) separated by a slight pause (1–3 milliseconds). The interpulse periods (IPPs) are varied depending on the level of light; in darker situations the bird emits shorter IPPs, as obstacles become harder to see, and longer IPPs are observed when the bird nears the exit of the cave. This behavior is similar to that of bats as they approach targets. The birds also emit a series of low clicks followed by a call when approaching the nests; presumably to warn nearby birds out of their way. It is thought that the double clicks are used to discriminate between individual birds. Aerodramus sawtelli, the Atiu swiftlet, and Aerodramus maximus, the black-nest swiftlet are the only known species which emit single clicks. The single click is thought be used to avoid voice overlap during echolocation. The use of a single click might be associated with an evolutionary shift in eastern Pacific swiftlets; determining how many clicks the Marquesan swiftlet emits could shed light on this. It was also discovered that both the Atiu swiftlet and the Papuan swiftlet emit clicks while foraging outside at dusk; the latter possibly only in these circumstances, considering that it might not nest in caves at all. Such behavior is not known to occur in other species, but quite possibly does, given that the Papuan and Atiu swiftlets are not closely related. However, it has recently been determined that the echolocation vocalizations do not agree with evolutionary relationship between swiftlet species as suggested by DNA sequence comparison. This suggests that as in bats, echolocation sounds, once present, adapt rapidly and independently to the particular species' acoustic environment.

Three hypotheses are considered to describe how echolocation evolved in the genus Aerodramus and, as determined more recently, other taxa in the Apodidae. One hypothesis states that echolocation evolved from an ancestral species of swiftlets and was lost in the genera which lack echolocation. A second hypothesis is that echolocation evolved independently several times. The third scenario involves a combination of the first two, i.e. a gain-loss-regain scenario.

Several functional subunits (like vocal muscles and brain areas) are needed to produce the echolocating system. Past studies have thought that the loss of one of these subunits was more likely to occur than acquiring all the traits needed to echolocate. Yet a recent study suggests that the echolocation subunits were mainly located in the central nervous system, while the subunits in the vocal apparatus were already present and capable of use before echolocation even evolved. This study supports the second hypothesis of independent evolution of echolocation in Aerodramus and Collocalia, with the subsequent evolution of complex behavior needed to complement the physical echolocation system, or even the third approach, as the vocal apparatus-parts of the echolocation system might even be inherited from some prehistoric nocturnal ancestor.

== Culinary use ==
Authentic bird's-nest soup is made from nests of some species of swiftlet, mainly the edible-nest (or white-nest) swiftlet (Aerodramus fuciphagus) and the black-nest swiftlet. Instead of twigs, feathers and straw, these swiftlets make their nest only from strands of their gummy saliva, which hardens when exposed to air. Once the nests are harvested, they are cleaned and sold to restaurants. Eating swiftlet nest material is believed to help maintain skin tone, balance qi ("life energy") and reinforce the immune system. It is also believed to strengthen the lungs and prevent coughs, improve the constitution and prolong life. The nutritional value of 100 g of dry nest includes 49.9 g of water-soluble protein (including amido nitrogen, monoamine nitrogen, non-amino nitrogen, arginine, humin, histidine, lysine and cysteine), 30.6 g carbohydrate (glycoprotein and mucin), 4.9 g iron, 2.5 g inorganic salt (including potassium, sodium, calcium, magnesium, sulfur, phosphorus, silica and other trace elements), and 1.4 g fiber (Dictionary of Traditional Chinese Medicine, The History of Chinese Medicine and the Nutrition Table).

The energy contained in 100 g of swiftlet nest is 345 kcal. The nests are often served simmered in chicken broth.

Authentic bird's-nest soup is quite popular throughout Asia. It is also extremely expensive; many western restaurants serve a less expensive version consisting of soup with noodles shaped to resemble a bird's nest.

== Cave ecology ==
Guano from both the swiftlets and the many bats that inhabit the caves supports a huge array of specialized animals that feed on the dung. There are yet other creatures that have evolved to feed on these dung eaters as well as on the bats and the swiftlets themselves, including snakes that can climb the sheer walls to snatch a passing meal and huge carnivorous crickets that prey on chicks and bat pups. This cave fauna ecosystem is self-sustaining, the only link with the outside being the birds and the bats that bring the nutrients into the caves in the first place.

The Philippine municipality of El Nido in Palawan, known for its limestone cliffs and pristine beaches, is home to a thriving bird's-nest market. The name El Nido is the Spanish term for literally "The Nest". Many locals still practice manual climbing of the limestone caves to gather swiftlet nests.

== Species ==
The Papuan swiftlet is apparently closer to the waterfall swift than to the other Aerodramus species and probably best placed in a separate genus, whereas Thomassen et al. (2005) advocate reuniting all swiftlets in Collocalia. Schoutedenapus is one of the least-known genera of birds.

- Genus Collocalia
  - Plume-toed swiftlet, Collocalia affinis
  - Grey-rumped swiftlet, Collocalia marginata
  - Ridgetop swiftlet, Collocalia isonota
  - Tenggara swiftlet, Collocalia sumbawae
  - Drab swiftlet, Collocalia neglecta
  - Glossy swiftlet, Collocalia esculenta
  - Satin swiftlet, Collocalia uropygialis
  - Bornean swiftlet, Collocalia dodgei
  - Cave swiftlet, Collocalia linchi
  - Christmas Island swiftlet, Collocalia natalis
  - Pygmy swiftlet, Collocalia troglodytes
- Genus Aerodramus
  - Seychelles swiftlet, Aerodramus elaphrus
  - Mascarene swiftlet, Aerodramus francicus
  - Indian swiftlet, Aerodramus unicolor
  - Philippine swiftlet, Aerodramus mearnsi
  - Moluccan swiftlet, Aerodramus infuscatus
  - Mountain swiftlet, Aerodramus hirundinaceus
  - White-rumped swiftlet, Aerodramus spodiopygius
  - Australian swiftlet, Aerodramus terraereginae
  - Himalayan swiftlet, Aerodramus brevirostris
  - Indochinese swiftlet, Aerodramus rogersi
  - Volcano swiftlet, Aerodramus vulcanorum
  - Whitehead's swiftlet, Aerodramus whiteheadi
  - Bare-legged swiftlet, Aerodramus nuditarsus
  - Mayr's swiftlet, Aerodramus orientalis
  - Palawan swiftlet, Aerodramus palawanensis
  - Mossy-nest swiftlet, Aerodramus salangana
  - Uniform swiftlet, Aerodramus vanikorensis
  - Palau swiftlet, Aerodramus pelewensis
  - Guam swiftlet, Aerodramus bartschi
  - Caroline Islands swiftlet, Aerodramus inquietus
  - Mangaia swiftlet, Aerodramus manuoi (prehistoric)
  - Atiu swiftlet, Aerodramus sawtelli
  - Polynesian swiftlet, Aerodramus leucophaeus
  - Marquesan swiftlet, Aerodramus ocistus
  - Black-nest swiftlet, Aerodramus maximus
  - Edible-nest swiftlet, Aerodramus fuciphagus
    - Brown-rumped swiftlet, Aerodramus (fuciphagus) vestitus
  - German's swiftlet, Aerodramus germani
  - Papuan swiftlet, Aerodramus papuensis – probably a distinct genus
- Genus Hydrochous
  - Giant swiftlet, Hydrochous gigas
- Genus Schoutedenapus
  - Scarce swift, Schoutedenapus myoptilus
