= C. esculenta =

C. esculenta may refer to:

- Canna esculenta, a garden plant
- Collocalia esculenta, the glossy swiftlet, a bird species found in Asia
- Colocasia esculenta, the taro or eddoe, a tropical plant species grown primarily for its edible corms

== See also ==
- List of Latin and Greek words commonly used in systematic names#E
