= Collocalia buday =

Collocalia buday Temporal range: Late Oligocene to Early Miocene, 28–16 Ma

Scientific classification
- Domain: Eukaryota
- Kingdom: Animalia
- Phylum: Chordata
- Class: Aves
- Clade: Strisores
- Order: Apodiformes
- Family: Apodidae
- Genus: Collocalia
- Species: †C. buday

Binomial name
- †Collocalia buday Boles, 2001

Extinct species of bird

Collocalia buday is an extinct species of large swiftlet from the Late Oligocene to Early Miocene of Australia. It was described in 2001 by Walter Boles from fossil material found at Riversleigh, in the Boodjamulla National Park of north-western Queensland.
