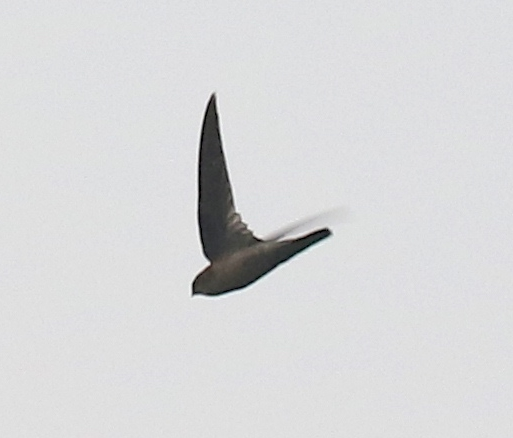

Conservation status
- Least Concern (IUCN 3.1)

Scientific classification
- Kingdom: Animalia
- Phylum: Chordata
- Class: Aves
- Order: Apodiformes
- Family: Apodidae
- Genus: Aerodramus
- Species: A. brevirostris

Binomial name
- Aerodramus brevirostris (Horsfield, 1840)

Synonyms
- Collocalia brevirostris Deignan, 1955

= Himalayan swiftlet =

Species of bird

The Himalayan swiftlet (Aerodramus brevirostris) is a small swift. It is a common colonial breeder in the Himalayas and Southeast Asia. Some populations are migratory.

This swiftlet was formerly placed in the genus Collocalia. Two of its five subspecies are frequently given full species status, A. b. rogersi as the Indochinese swiftlet, Aerodramus rogersi, and the isolated Javan form A. b. vulcanorum as the Volcano swiftlet, Aerodramus vulcanorum.

== Description ==
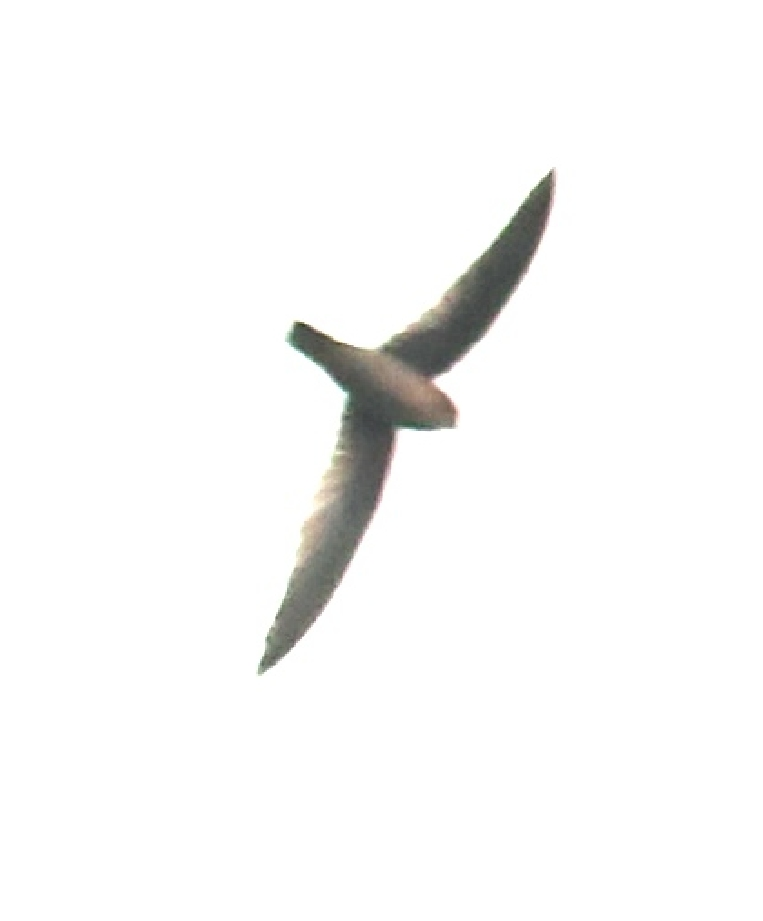
Himalayan Swiftlet - Thailand

This 13–14 cm long swiftlet has swept-back wings that resemble a crescent or a boomerang. The body is slender, and the tail is forked. It is, in many respects, a typical swift, having narrow wings for fast flight, and a wide gape and small beak surrounded by bristles for catching insects in flight. Its legs are very short, preventing the bird from perching, but allowing it to cling to vertical surfaces.

It is mainly grey-brown above and paler brown below. It has a pale grey rump and a pale patch above and behind the bill. The sexes are similar, but the juvenile has a less distinct rump.

There are five subspecies, differing mainly in the rump tone.

- A. b. brevirostris breeds in the Himalayas east to Bangladesh, Myanmar and Thailand. This, the nominate race, is an altitudinal migrant, breeding up to above 4,500 m, but wintering between 900 and 2750 m altitude.
- A. b. innominata breeds in central China, and winters in southwestern Thailand and the Malay Peninsula. The rump is slightly darker grey than nominate brevirostris
- A. b. inopina breeds in southwestern China. This is the darkest-rumped race.
- A. b. rogersi the Indochinese swiftlet, breeds in eastern Myanmar, western Thailand and Laos. This is a small, pale-rumped race.
- A. b. vulcanorum the volcano swiftlet, breeds in Java, Indonesia on volcanic peaks. It has dark underparts and an indistinct pale grey rump.

Over much of its range, this is the only swift, but in the south of its breeding area and much of its wintering range it can be very difficult to distinguish this species from other Collocalia swiftlets.

== Voice and echolocation ==
The Himalayan swiftlet has a twittering chit-chit roosting call, and also has a piercing teeree-teeree-teeree call.

What distinguishes many, but not all, swiftlet species from other swifts and indeed almost all other birds (the oilbird being an exception) is their ability to use a simple but effective form of echolocation to navigate through the darkness of the caves where they roost at night and breed. With the present species, at least vulcanorum is known to echolocate.

Unlike bats, the swiftlets make clicking noises for echolocation that are well within the human range of hearing. Two broadband pulses are separated by a slight pause. The length of the pause shortens as light becomes poorer. The clicks are followed by the twittering call when the bird is approaching its nest.

Echolocation was used to separate the former genus Aerodramus, which was thought to contain the only echolocating swiftlets. from Collocalia, but the discovery that the pygmy swiftlet, Collocalia troglodytes, also echolocates led to some taxonomists merging the two genera.

== Behaviour ==
This swiftlet is a highland species, with a preference for feeding open areas in forests, such as river valleys. A. b. brevirostris breeds up 4,500 m in Nepal and 2200m in central Bhutan, and the forms A. b. rogersi and A. b. inniminata occur up to 2200 m in Thailand.

The tiny cup nest is constructed by the male swift from thick saliva and some moss, and is attached to a vertical rock wall in a cave. Nests of this colonial swift may be touching. The clutch is two white eggs. This swiftlet is monogamous and both partners take part in caring for the nestlings.

The Himalayan swiftlet, like all swifts, is an aerial insectivore, leaving the cave during the day to forage, and returning to its roost at night. In the evening or bad weather, flocks may descend from the hills to feed over cultivated land. This gregarious species forms flocks typically of about 50 birds, but up to 300 have been recorded. Its flight is mainly gliding due to very long primary feathers and small breast muscles.

== Status ==
This species is common and widespread, but the volcano swiftlet, if considered a separate species, is near-threatened. It occurs only on active volcanos in Java, with four definite sites and five likely but unconfirmed sites. Birdlife International estimates a total of under 400 birds for the known localities. Since this form nests in crater crevices, and all known localities are active volcanoes, colonies are believed to be susceptible to periodic extinction.
