= Robert Cecil Beavan =

British army officer and zoologist

- Born: 1841; United Kingdom
- Died: March 2, 1870 (aged 28–29); At sea
- Occupation: Zoologist
- Known for: Examining species in India

Captain Robert Cecil Beavan (14 August 1841 – 3 February 1870), corresponding member of the Zoological Society of London, served in India with the Bengal Staff Corps for 10 years. During his short life he collected specimens of birds and eggs at various locations. He contributed notes to the Ibis journal as wells as the Proceedings of the Zoological Society of London. He also collaborated with Allan Octavian Hume. His collection of eggs and birds went into the Natural History Museum through the Tweeddale and Godman-Salvin collections.

In 1864 Beavan worked at Barrackpore and the winter of that year was spent in the Maunbhoom District, an area studied earlier by Samuel Tickell and Edward Blyth. His notes on this period were published in The Ibis (1865) entitled "Notes on various Indian Birds". While still in service he collected in the Andaman Islands and with additional information from Colonel Robert Christopher Tytler, wrote "The Avifauna of the Andaman Islands" in the Ibis in 1867.

Beavan was sent home once to Britain due to bad health, and on his second such trip, he died at sea.

The species Pyrrhula erythaca, first collected by him, is sometimes called Beavan's Bullfinch (Also called Gray-headed Bullfinch).

His brother, Reginald, a lieutenant in the 22nd Punjab Native Infantry (Bengal Staff Corps where he was Lieutenant 1 Jan 1862, Captain 4 May 1872, Major 4 May 1880), was a keen sports hunter and took an interest in fishes.

== Publications ==
Beavan's chief publications are a series of notes in the Ibis between 1865 and 1868. These included many notes of Colonel R C Tytler.

- Ibis, 1865, pp. 400–423
- XVIII. The Avifauna of the Andaman Islands. Ibis 9(3):314–334
- XXVI. Notes on various Indian Birds. Ibis 9(4):430–455 (1867)
- VIII. Notes on Various Indian Birds. Ibis 10(1):73–85 (1868)
- XIII. Notes on Various Indian Birds. Ibis 10(2):165–181
- XXXI. Notes on Various Indian Birds. Ibis 10(4):370–406 (Address South Penge Park 18 July 1868)
- XXXVII. Additional Notes on various Indian Birds. Ibis 11(4):403–426
- (Accipitres) P. Z. S. 1868, pp. 390–402.

Reginald appears to have communicated some of Robert's papers to the Proceedings of the Zoological society after his death. The Handbook of the freshwater fishes of India, was published posthumously in 1877 and is attributed to "Capt. R. Beavan, Bengal Staff Corps CMZS".

- Descriptions of two imperfectly known Species of Cyprinoid Fishes from the Punjab, India. By Lieut. Reginald Beavan, F.R.G.S., Revenue Survey Department of India. PSZL, pages 150–153, 1872. (Note: It is unclear if this work is by Reginald Beavan or whether he merely communicated them)
- A communication was read from Capt. R. Beavan, Bengal Staff Corps, C.M.Z.S., containing a list of fishes met with in the river Nerbudda, Minar district of India. PZSL, p. 685, 1873 (Note: In the index volume for the PZSL, this entry is listed under the full name of Reginald Beavan.)
