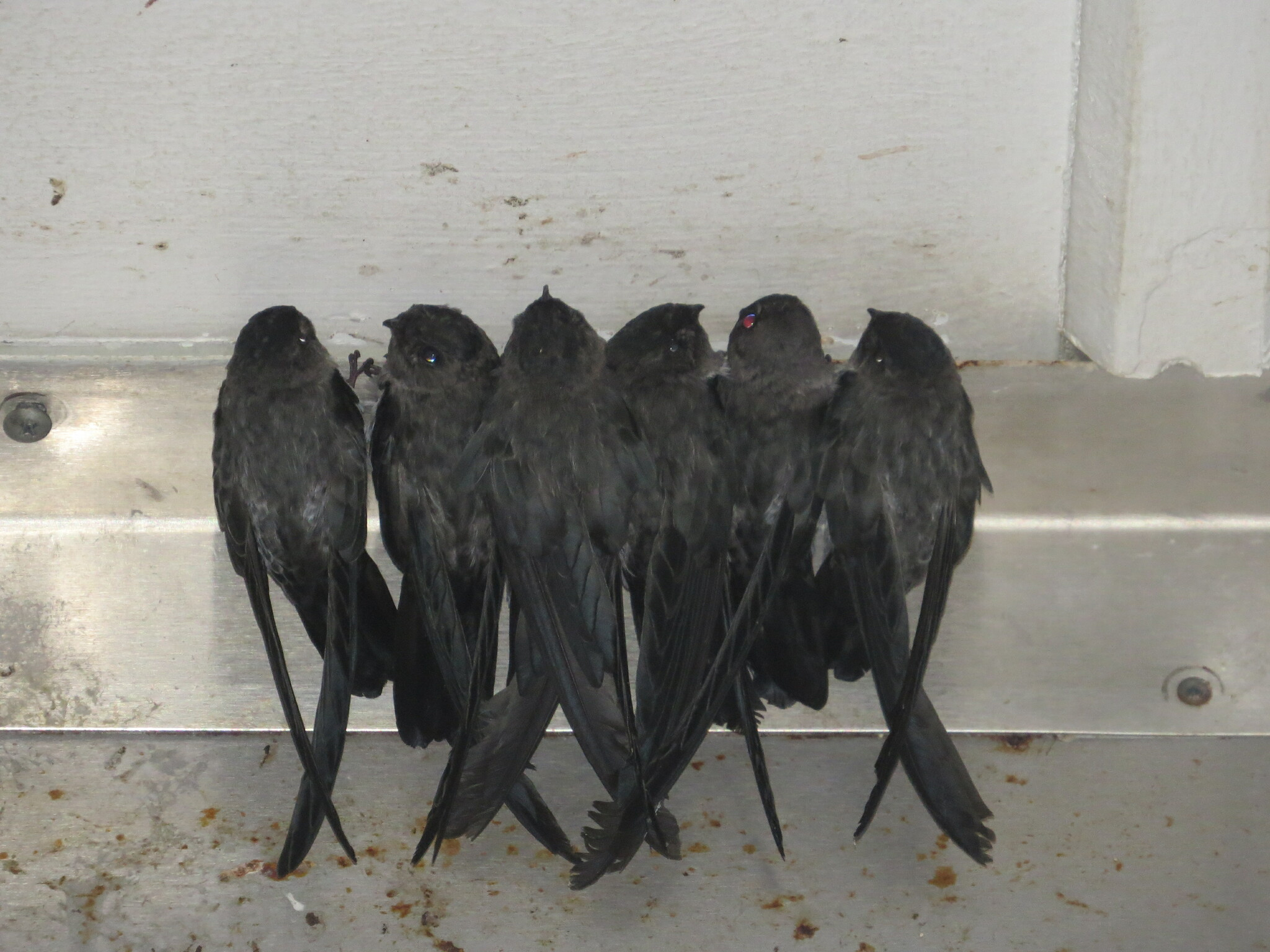

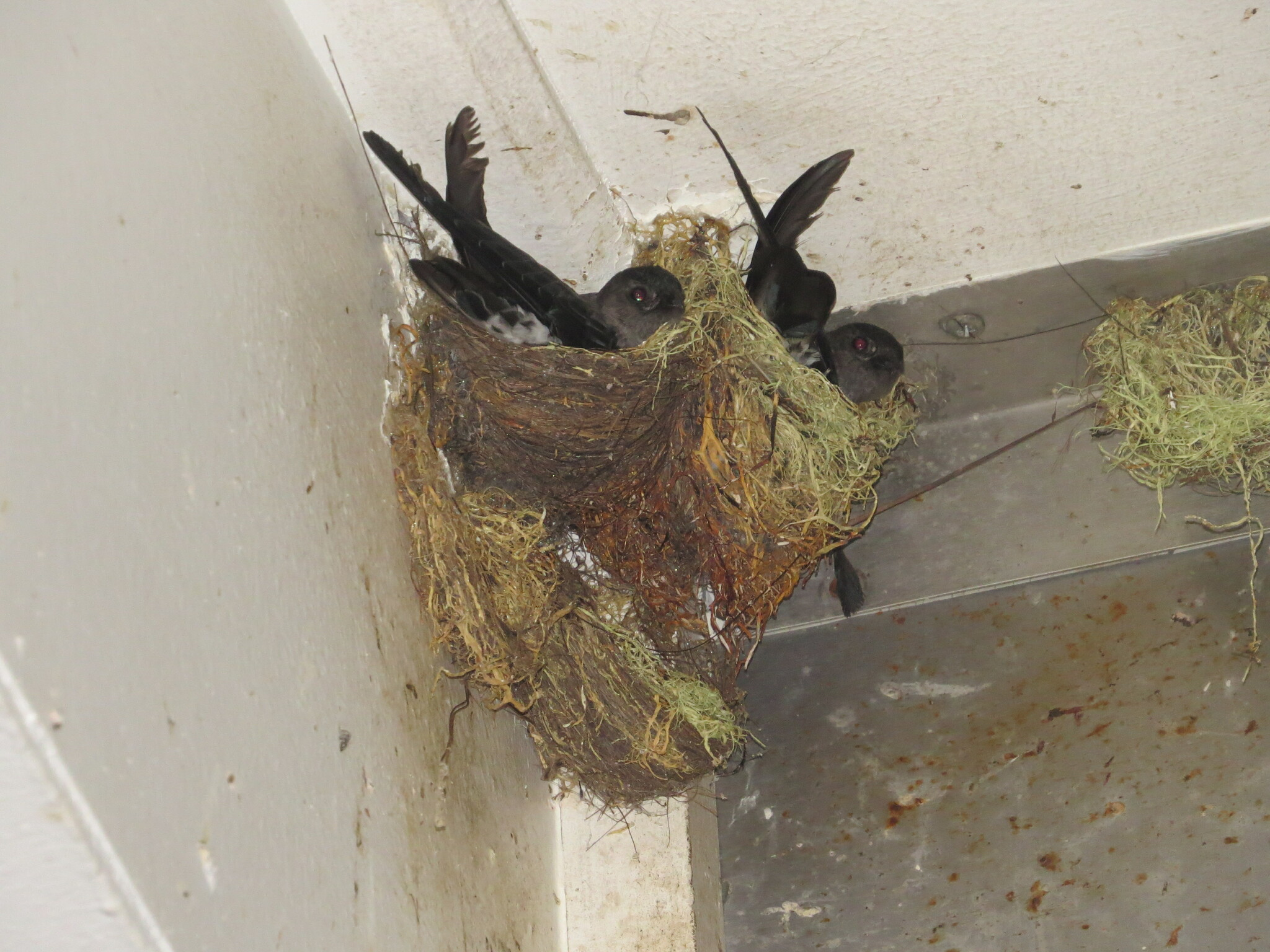

Scientific classification
- Kingdom: Animalia
- Phylum: Chordata
- Class: Aves
- Clade: Strisores
- Order: Apodiformes
- Family: Apodidae
- Genus: Collocalia
- Species: C. natalis

Binomial name
- Collocalia natalis Lister, 1889

Synonyms
- Collocalia esculenta natalis; Collocalia linchi natalis

= Christmas Island swiftlet =

Species of bird

The Christmas Island swiftlet (Collocalia natalis), also known as the Christmas glossy swiftlet or the Christmas cave swiftlet, is a small bird in the swift family Apodidae. It is endemic to Christmas Island, an Australian territory in the eastern Indian Ocean. It was formerly commonly treated as a subspecies of the glossy swiftlet.

== Taxonomy ==
The Christmas Island swiftlet was described by the English naturalist Joseph Lister in 1889 with the scientific name Collocalia esculenta natalis. It has usually been considered a subspecies of the glossy swiftlet (Collocalia esculenta). However, in 2008 the taxonomists Les Christidis and Walter Boles treated the swiftlet as a subspecies of the cave swiftlet (Collocalia linchi). It was raised to species status based on a detailed analysis of the swiftlets in the genus Collocalia published in 2017.

== Description ==
The Christmas Island swiftlet is a small swiftlet some 9–11 cm (3.5–4.3 in) in length. It is mainly glossy blue-black or green-black above, with dark grey underparts relieved by a prominent white belly and vent.

== Distribution and habitat ==
This swiftlet is restricted to the 135 km^{2} Christmas Island where it is commonly seen in large numbers in flight above the tropical rainforest that covers 75% of the island, as well as over other terrestrial habitats there. It nests mainly in caves in the limestone cliffs surrounding the island.

== Behaviour ==
=== Breeding ===
The swiftlet breeds deep in caves, in almost total darkness. It builds a small cup-shaped nest for its clutch of two eggs, high up on the cave wall and often sheltered by a stalactite. The nests are made of dried palm fibres and lichen and are cemented to the cave wall with the bird's saliva.

=== Feeding ===
The swiftlet feeds aerially on flying ants and other insects.

== Status and conservation ==
Garnett & Crowley (2000) considered the swiftlet, along with a suite of Christmas Island's other endemics, as critically endangered, with the principal threat coming from the yellow crazy ants which were accidentally introduced to the island. The threat is not only that of direct ant predation of swiftlet nestlings, but also indirectly from potentially massive changes to the ecology of the island caused by the ants. Sometimes the bird breeds in hollow trees and these nests are susceptible to attack by the ants, but the ants do not enter the limestone caverns that are the principle breeding site and are not therefore likely to impact directly on the swiftlet. An application made in 2006 to list the swiftlet as threatened under the Environment Protection and Biodiversity Conservation Act 1999 was unsuccessful.
