= Giant swiftlet =

Conservation status
- Least Concern (IUCN 3.1)

Scientific classification
- Kingdom: Animalia
- Phylum: Chordata
- Class: Aves
- Clade: Strisores
- Order: Apodiformes
- Family: Apodidae
- Genus: Hydrochous; Brooke, 1970
- Species: H. gigas

Binomial name
- Hydrochous gigas (Hartert, EJO & Butler, AL, 1901)

Synonyms
- Hydrochrous gigas (Hartert, EJO & Butler, AL, 1901) [orthographic error]

Species of bird

The giant swiftlet (Hydrochous gigas), also known as the waterfall swift, is a species of bird in the swift family, Apodidae. It is the only member of the monotypic genus Hydrochous. It is found in Malaysia, Sumatra and Java, where its natural habitats are subtropical or tropical moist montane forests and rivers. It may be threatened by habitat loss.

The giant swiftlet has the largest average wingspan of all the swiftlets, at 150 millimeters. It is a fairly large swift that can grow to 16 cm in length. The female weighs 35 to 39 grams, and the male around 37 grams. Unlike other swiftlets, it builds its nest on a flat horizontal surface instead of molding it against a vertical surface with saliva.

It is not totally nocturnal, lacking the echolocation seen in some other swiftlets, but is still able to orientate visually in dim light.
