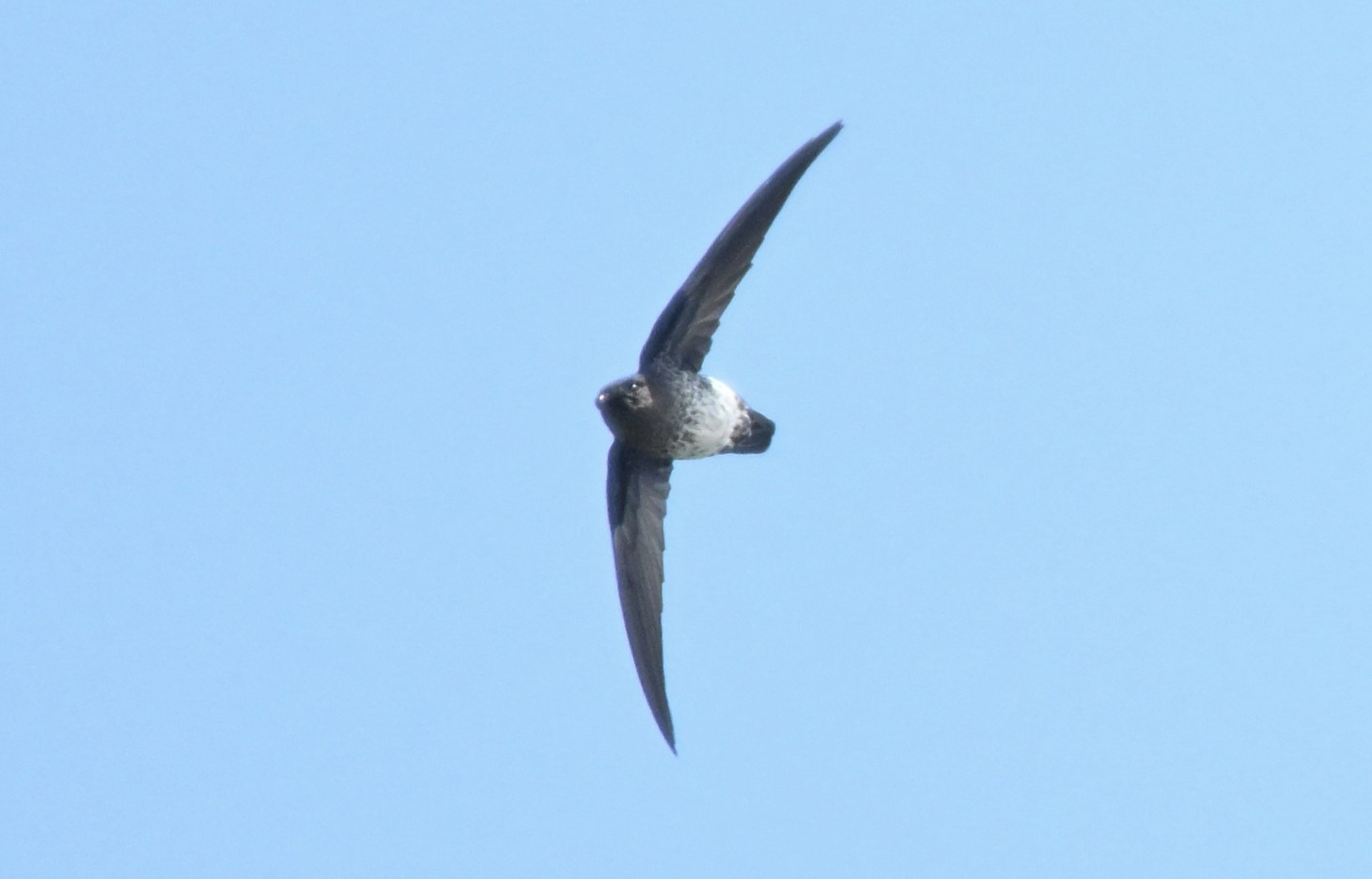

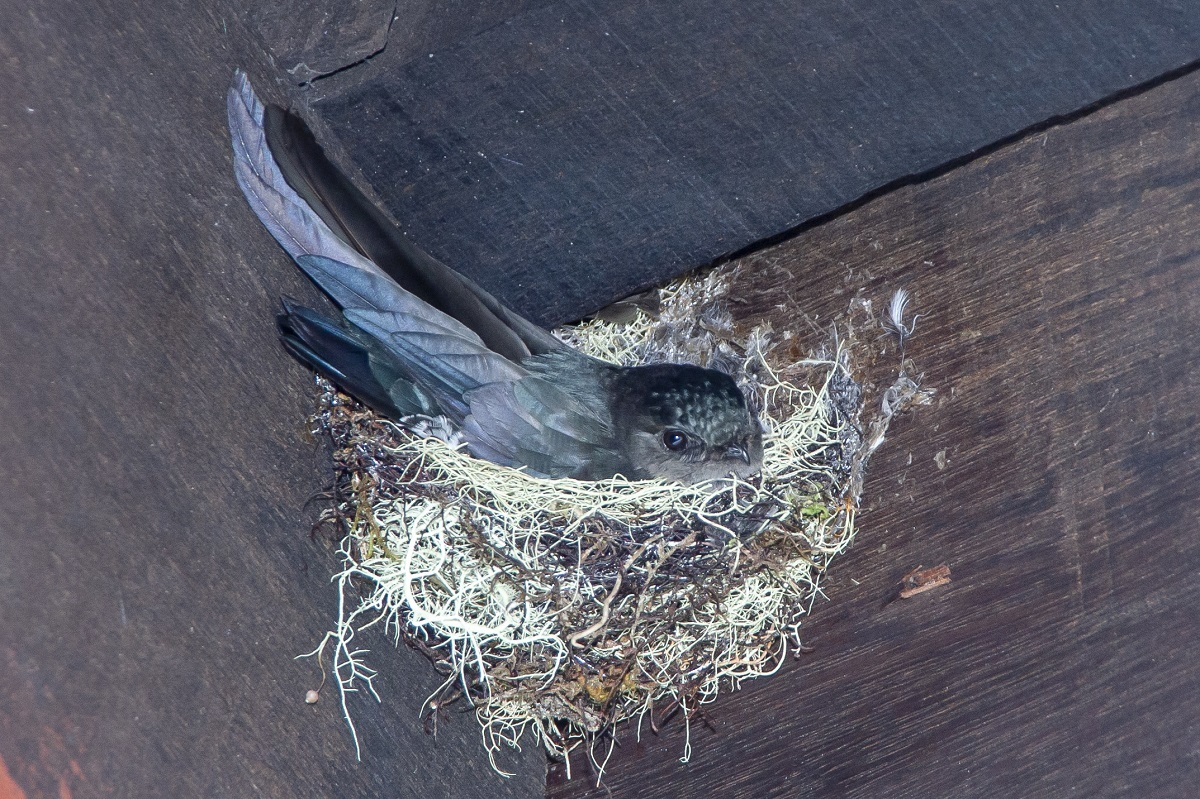

Scientific classification
- Kingdom: Animalia
- Phylum: Chordata
- Class: Aves
- Order: Apodiformes
- Family: Apodidae
- Genus: Collocalia
- Species: C. affinis

Binomial name
- Collocalia affinis Beavan, 1867

Synonyms
- Collocalia esculenta affinis

= Plume-toed swiftlet =

Species of bird

The plume-toed swiftlet (Collocalia affinis) is a small bird in the swift family Apodidae. It is found on some eastern Indian Ocean islands, the Malay Peninsula, Sumatra, and lowland Borneo.

Its natural habitat is subtropical or tropical moist lowland forests. It was previously considered a subspecies of the glossy swiftlet.

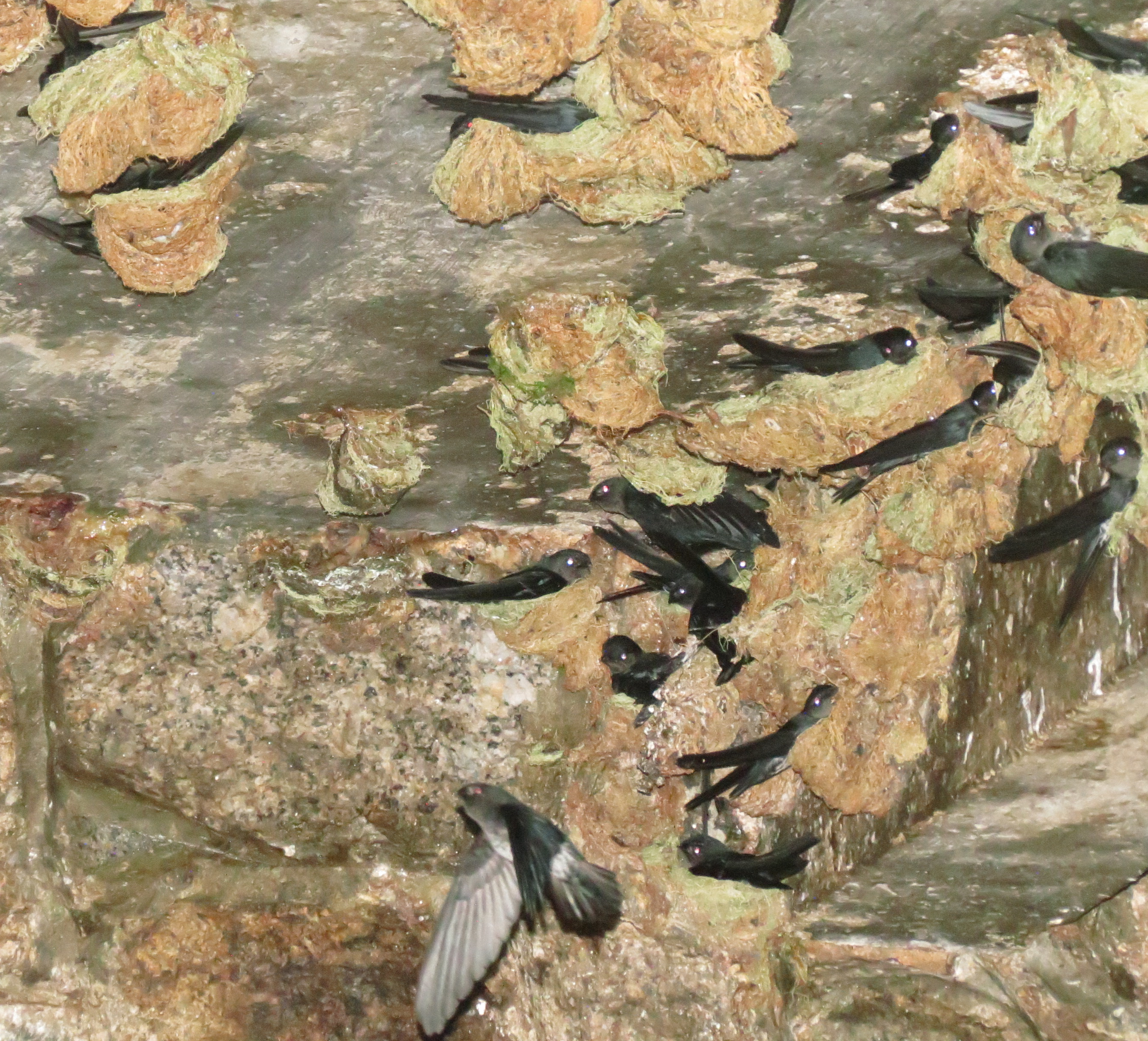
Plume-toed swiftlets entering and exiting their nests

== Taxonomy ==
The plume-toed swiftlet was described by the English ornithologist Robert Cecil Beavan in 1867 and given current binomial name Collocalia affinis. The type locality is Port Blair in the Andaman Islands. The specific epithet affinis is Latin for "related" or "applied". The plume-toed swiftlet was previously treated as a subspecies of the glossy swiftlet but was promoted to species status based on the results of a detailed analysis of the swiftlets in the genus Collocalia published in 2017.

There are five subspecies:

- Collocalia affinis affinis Beavan, 1867 – Andaman and Nicobar Islands in the eastern Indian Ocean
- Collocalia affinis elachyptera Oberholser, 1906 – Mergui Archipelago off the west coast of southern Myanmar
- Collocalia affinis vanderbilti Rodolphe Meyer de Schauensee & Ripley, 1940 – Nias Island off the west coast of Sumatra
- Collocalia affinis oberholseri Stresemann, 1912 – Batu and Mentawai Islands off the west coast of Sumatra
- Collocalia affinis cyanoptila Oberholser, 1906 – Malay Peninsula, Sumatra, Natuna Islands and lowland Borneo

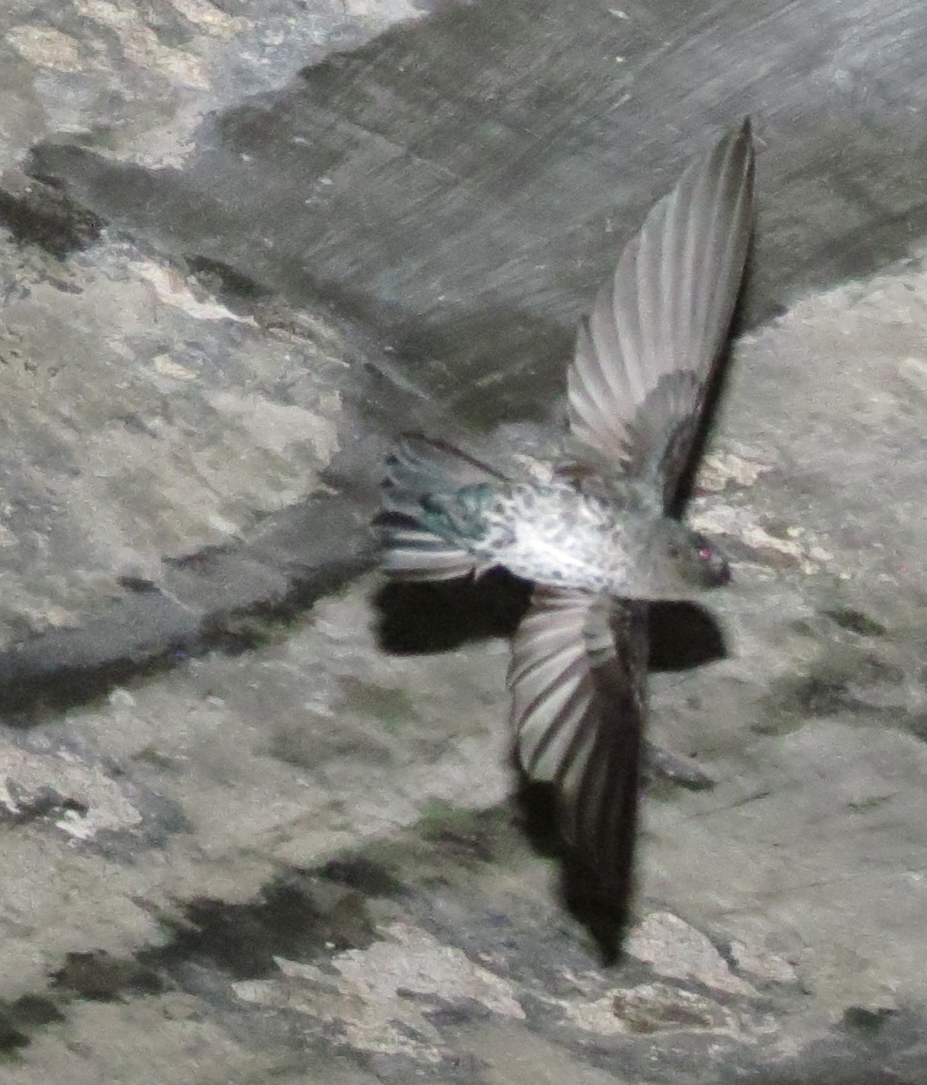
Plume-toed swiftlet leaving its nest

== Description ==
The plume-toed swiftlet is 9–10 cm (3.5–3.9 in) in length with a square tail. The back and upper surface of the wings are uniformly dark greenish-blue with a moderate gloss. The throat and upper breast are dark grey merging into large greyish chevrons over the lower breast and flanks, usually becoming white over the belly. There is a tuft of small feathers on the hallux, the rear facing toe. This species lacks a pale contrasting rump and has no white spots on the inner webs of the tail feathers.
