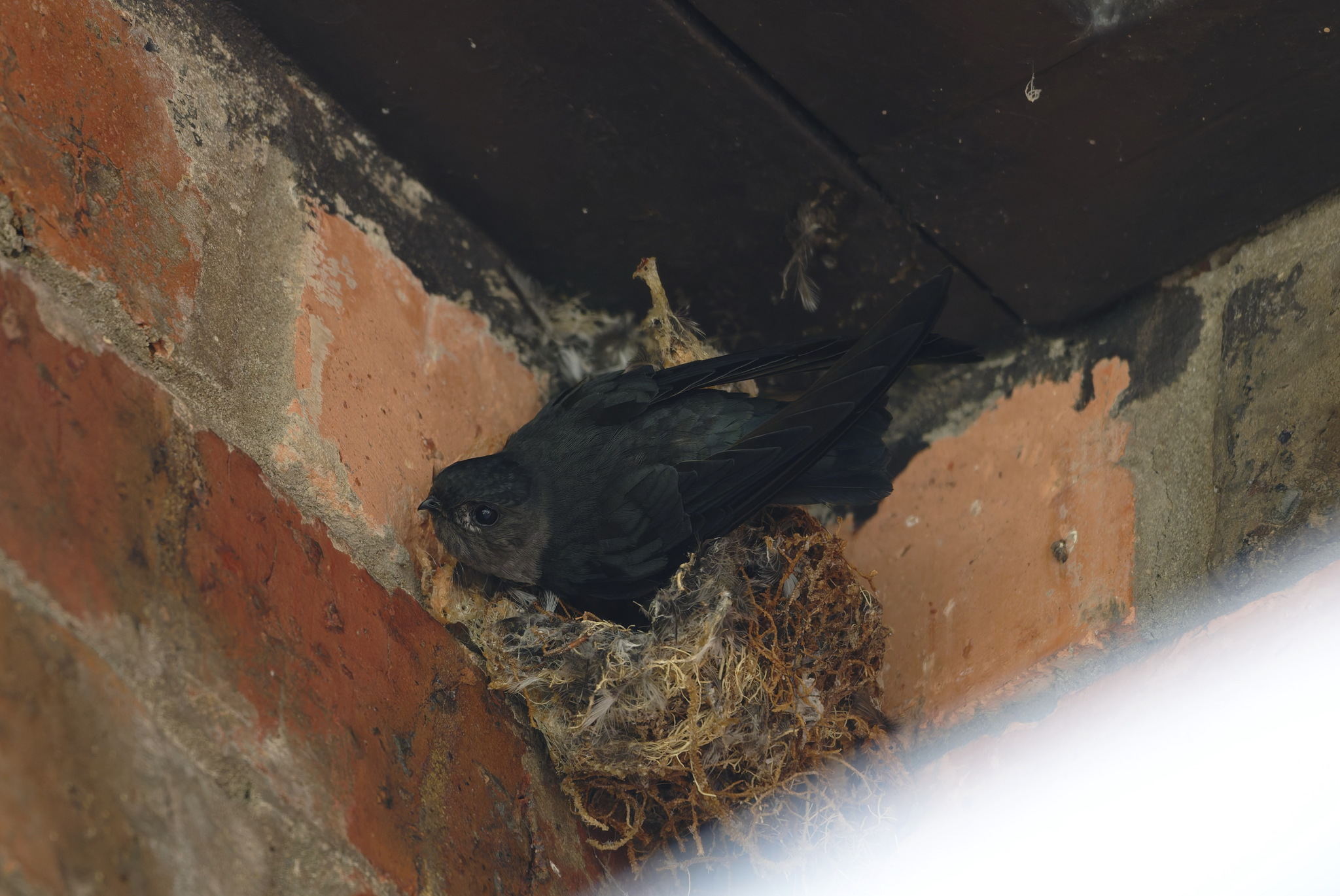

Scientific classification
- Kingdom: Animalia
- Phylum: Chordata
- Class: Aves
- Order: Apodiformes
- Family: Apodidae
- Genus: Collocalia
- Species: C. dodgei

Binomial name
- Collocalia dodgei Richmond, 1905

Synonyms
- Collocalia esculenta dodgei; Collocalia linchi dodgei

= Bornean swiftlet =

Species of bird

The Bornean swiftlet (Collocalia dodgei), also referred to as the Kinabalu 'linchi' swiftlet, is a small bird in the swift family Apodidae. It is endemic to the northern mountains of the island of Borneo. It has variously been considered a subspecies of the glossy swiftlet or the cave swiftlet, and in 2008 was split from the latter (C. linchi) as a full species C. dodgei.

== Taxonomy ==
The Bornean swiftlet was described by the American ornithologist Charles Richmond in 1905 under current binomial name Collocalia dodgei. The specific epithet dodgei is in honour of H. D. Dodge who had collected the specimen on Mount Kinabalu in Borneo.

== Description ==
At about 10 cm in length it is a tiny swiftlet with relatively short wings and a square tail. Mainly glossy dark grey to black in colour, it has a white belly. Compared with the glossy swiftlet, which also occurs within its range, it is slightly smaller, with a greenish, rather than bluish, gloss to the feathers, and with no white tail spots; nor does it have feathered hind toes.

== Distribution and habitat ==
It is seen mainly around the massif of Mount Kinabalu, though there is a record from the Maligan Range of south-central Sabah. It has been found nesting on a hut at 2370 m above sea level on Kinabalu.
