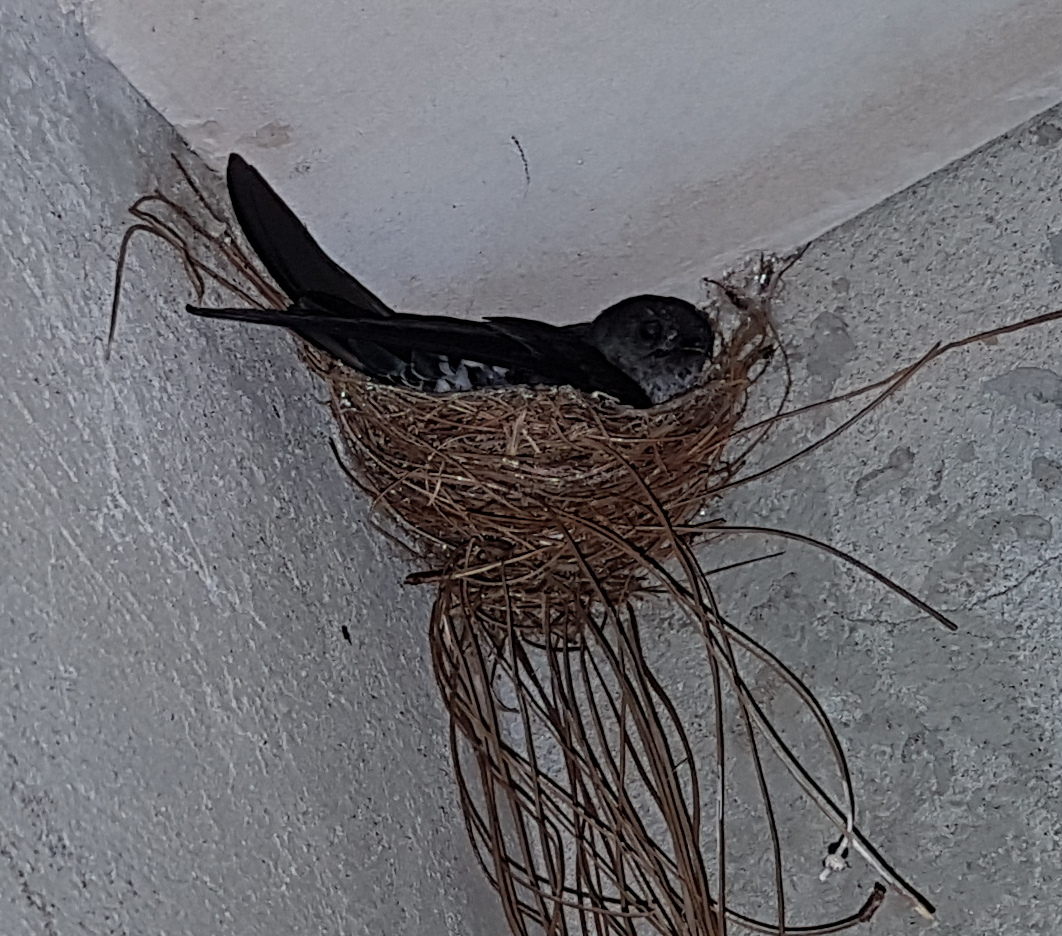
- Ridgetop swiftlet nesting in Bukidnon, Mindanao, Philippines

Scientific classification
- Kingdom: Animalia
- Phylum: Chordata
- Class: Aves
- Order: Apodiformes
- Family: Apodidae
- Genus: Collocalia
- Species: C. isonota

Binomial name
- Collocalia isonota Oberholser, 1906

Synonyms
- Collocalia esculenta isonata; Collocalia linchi isonota

= Ridgetop swiftlet =

Species of bird

The ridgetop swiftlet (Collocalia isonota) is a small bird in the swift family Apodidae. It is endemic to the Philippines where it is found on Luzon, Mindanao and the Sulu Archipelago.

Its natural habitat is tropical moist lowland forests. It was previously considered a subspecies of the glossy swiftlet.

== Description ==
The ridgetop swiftlet is 9–10 cm (3.5–3.9 in) in length with a square tail. The back and upper surface of the wings are a dark dull blue with a moderate green gloss. The rump is sometimes slightly paler due to the white margins of feathers forming the uppertail coverts. The throat and upper breast are dark grey with fine white scalloping merging into larger greyish chevrons over the lower breast and flanks, becoming white over the belly. There is sometimes a tuft of small feathers on the hallux, the rear facing toe. This species lacks the white spots on the inner webs of the tail feathers that are present in some Collocalia species.

== Taxonomy ==
The ridgetop swiftlet was described by the American ornithologist Harry Oberholser in 1906 as a subspecies of the cave swiftlet with the trinomial name Collocalia linchi isonota. The type locality is the province of Benguet on the island of Luzon in the Philippines. The specific epithet isonota is from the Ancient Greek isos meaning "equal" or "similar" and nōton meaning "back". The ridgetop swiftlet was formerly treated as a subspecies of the glossy swiftlet but was promoted to species status based on the results of a detailed analysis of the swiftlets in the genus Collocalia published in 2017.

There are two subspecies:

- C. i. sumbawae Oberholser, 1906 – northern Luzon, (northern Philippines)
- C. i. bagobo Hachisuka, 1930 – Mindanao, Mindoro, Sulu Archipelago (southern Philippines)

== Ecology and behavior ==
Not much is known about this species' diet but it is presumed to feed on small insects in flight.

Nests on man made structures, caves, and cliffs. Their nest is made out of moss, dry grass, and occasionally feathers, all of which are bonded with its saliva. Not much else is known about its breeding.

== Habitat and conservation ==
Seen in almost any habitat including coastal areas, montane forest, agricultural lands and even roads. It is still most frequently seen in forests and clearings.

International Union for Conservation of Nature does not yet recognize this as its own species. It has assessed its parent species, the glossy swiftlet as least-concern species.
