= Mayr's swiftlet =

Conservation status
- Data Deficient (IUCN 3.1)

Scientific classification
- Kingdom: Animalia
- Phylum: Chordata
- Class: Aves
- Order: Apodiformes
- Family: Apodidae
- Genus: Aerodramus
- Species: A. orientalis

Binomial name
- Aerodramus orientalis (Mayr, 1935)

Synonyms
- Collocalia orientalis

Species of bird

Mayr's swiftlet (Aerodramus orientalis) is a species of swift in the family Apodidae. It is found in New Ireland and Guadalcanal.
