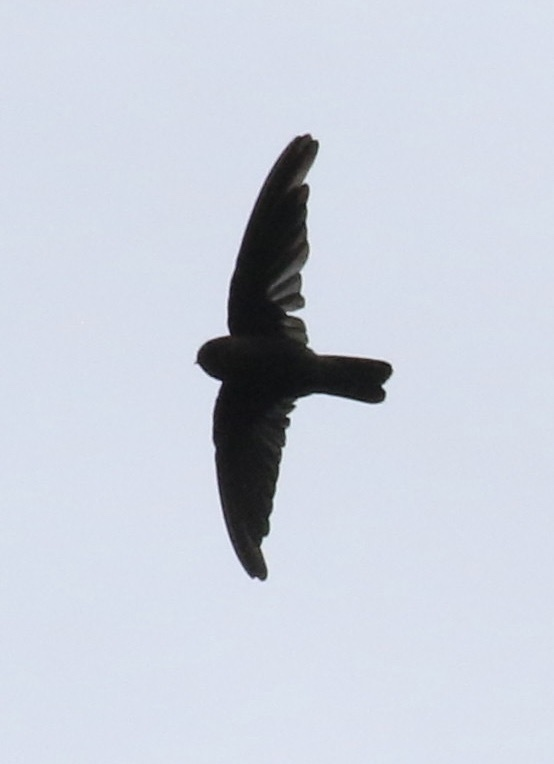

Conservation status
- Least Concern (IUCN 3.1)

Scientific classification
- Kingdom: Animalia
- Phylum: Chordata
- Class: Aves
- Order: Apodiformes
- Family: Apodidae
- Genus: Aerodramus
- Species: A. leucophaeus

Binomial name
- Aerodramus leucophaeus (Peale, 1849)

Synonyms
- Collocalia leucophaeus (Peale, 1848) [orth. error]; Collocalia leucophaea

= Tahiti swiftlet =

Species of bird

The Tahiti swiftlet or Polynesian swiftlet (Aerodramus leucophaeus) is a species of swift in the family Apodidae. While often compared to the Marquesan Swiftlet, this bird is often more pale faced. The subspecies is the Monotypic which means it does not include a subspecies.

It is endemic to the Society Islands in French Polynesia, where it occurs on Tahiti and Moorea.

== Description ==
Aerodramus leucophaeus is closely related to Aerodramus sawtelli. Characteristics include slightly short wings, forked tail, dark brown upperparts, and grey brown underparts. Birds' wings typically get shorter the closer they live to the equator, explaining why these swiflets are located closer to the Southern Island region. This is due to the fact that the bird's short wings are not equipped to travel far distances, causing the bird to remain in relatively restricted areas for most of its life. This bird is about 11 cm with a forked tail.

They have a dry call with repeated intervals. The call is also heard as insect-like and trilling. The trilling sound is usually associated with high pitched sounds. Birds hear at a much quicker frequency than humans, allowing them to understand this call.

It has been reported that this species has some form of echolocation.

Bird echolocation is limited to a lower frequency, having poorer resolution than that of echolocation in bats and other animals. This low frequency makes the echolocation audible to humans. Birds such as the swiftlet use echolocation to locate their way around dark caves and nesting locations in order to settle safely.

== Diet and habitat ==
The Swiftlet feeds on insects, which it captures while in flight, feeding at high elevations. It prefers wet, rocky and forested valleys at high elevations, and nests either in shallow depressions with overhanging rocks, coastal cliffs or caves. Populations have been found in the Polynesian Island Moorea. They have a wide variety of nest sites: caves, depressions under coastal cliffs or rocks, and are supported using saliva. Nests were found in Marquesas. Marquesa is a volcanic island located in French Polynesia.

The climate of the Society Islands is hot and humid between the months of November and April, but cool and dry through the remaining months of the year.

The island of Moorea consists of jagged peaks and includes a large mountain range made up of ancient volcanoes.

== Conservation ==
Currently this species is not globally threatened. They are classified as vulnerable, but stable. This is due to predation on eggs. It is typical of this species to lay two eggs at a time. Nests of this species are made with vegetable matter and held together by saliva. This species remains rare, surviving in only a few valleys and continue to be a priority to conserve. They are mostly found in flocks, (up to 100).

Total population estimate of 200–500 birds in 1984 and currently still thought to number fewer than 1000 individuals of which the most important subpopulation (100 birds) is in Papehue Valley.
