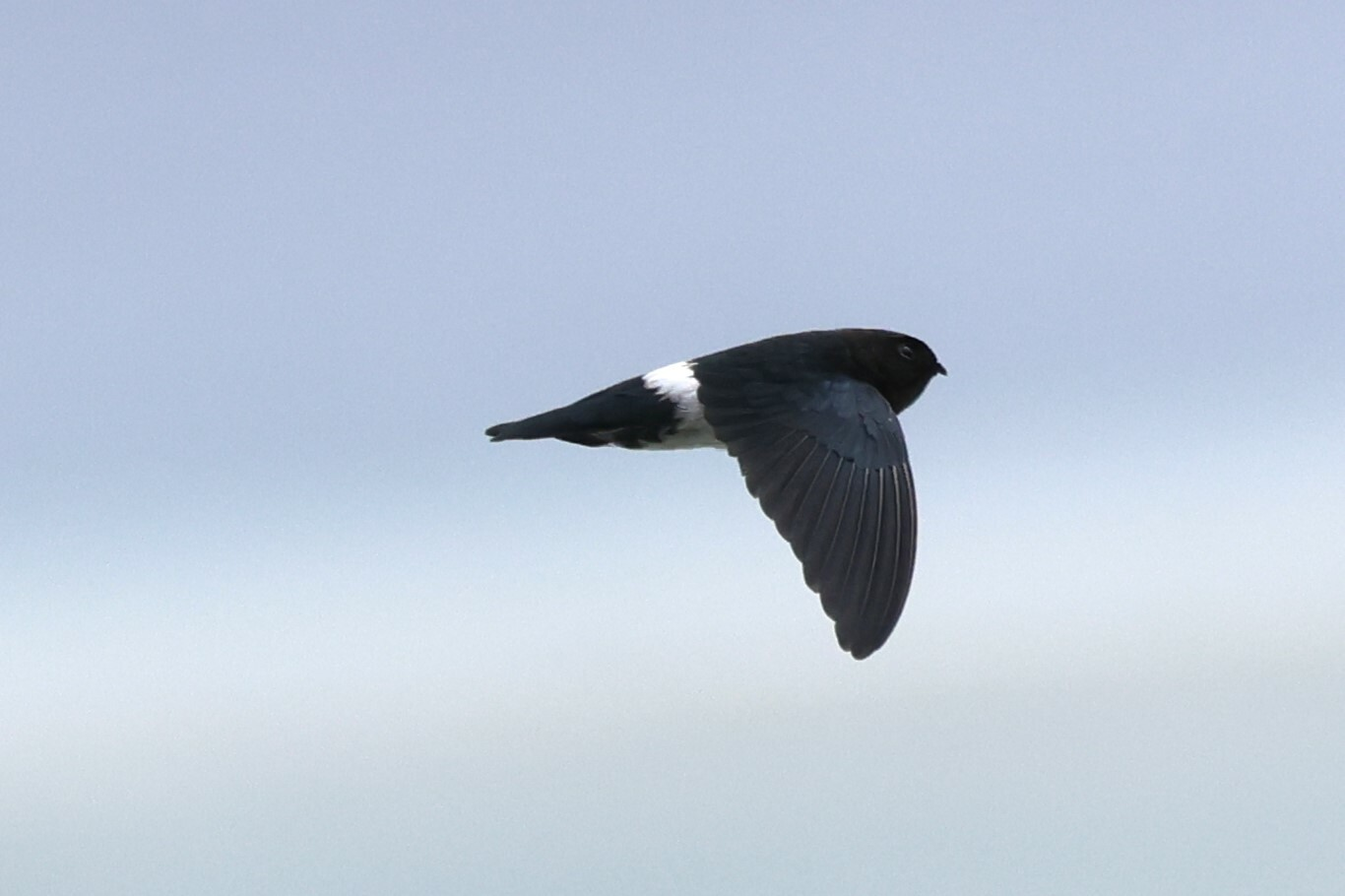

Scientific classification
- Kingdom: Animalia
- Phylum: Chordata
- Class: Aves
- Clade: Strisores
- Order: Apodiformes
- Family: Apodidae
- Genus: Collocalia
- Species: C. uropygialis

Binomial name
- Collocalia uropygialis Gray, GR, 1866

Synonyms
- Collocalia esculenta uropygialis

= Satin swiftlet =

Species of bird

The satin swiftlet (Collocalia uropygialis) is a small bird in the swift family Apodidae. It is endemic to the Santa Cruz Islands, Vanuatu, New Caledonia and the Loyalty Islands in the southwestern Pacific Ocean. It was formerly treated as a subspecies of the glossy swiftlet.

== Taxonomy ==
The satin swiftlet was described by the English zoologist George Robert Gray in 1866 as a subspecies of the glossy swiftlet with the scientific name Collocalia esculenta uropygialis. The type locality is Aneityum, the southernmost island of Vanuatu. The epithet uropygialis is from the Latin uropygialis meaning "rump". The satin swiftlet was formerly treated as a subspecies of the glossy swiftlet but was promoted to species status based on the results of a detailed analysis of the swiftlets in the genus Collocalia published in 2017.

Two subspecies are recognised:

- C. u. uropygialis Gray, GR, 1866 – Santa Cruz Islands and Vanuatu
- C. u. albidior Salomonsen, 1983 – Loyalty Islands and New Caledonia

== Description ==
The satin swiftlet is around 10 cm (4 in) in length. The back is satin blueish black. The throat and upper breast are plain dark grey, the lower breast, flanks and belly are white. The tail feathers are dark but there are usually dull white spots on the inner webs. The subspecies albidior is larger and has large white spots on the inner webs of the tail feathers. The upper breast is a paler grey with white margins to the feathers.
