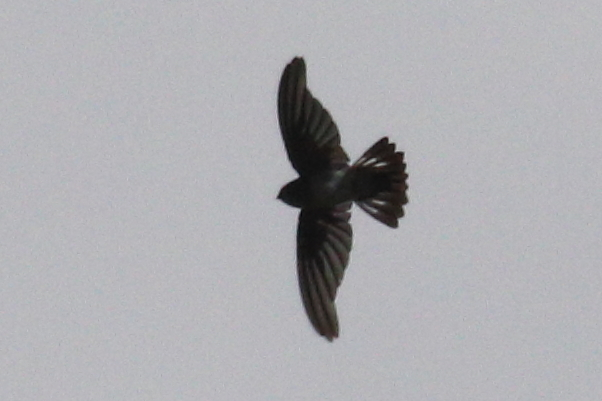

Scientific classification
- Kingdom: Animalia
- Phylum: Chordata
- Class: Aves
- Order: Apodiformes
- Family: Apodidae
- Genus: Collocalia
- Species: C. sumbawae

Binomial name
- Collocalia sumbawae Stresemann, 1925

Synonyms
- Collocalia esculenta sumbawae

= Tenggara swiftlet =

Species of bird

The Tenggara swiftlet (Collocalia sumbawae) is a small bird in the swift family Apodidae. It is endemic to the western Lesser Sunda Islands of Indonesia.

Its natural habitat is subtropical or tropical moist lowland forests. It was previously considered a subspecies of the glossy swiftlet.

== Taxonomy ==
The Tenggara swiftlet was described by the German ornithologist Erwin Stresemann in 1925 under the present binomial name Collocalia sumbawae. The type locality is the island of Sumbawa in the Lesser Sunda Islands. The Tenggara swiftlet was formerly treated as a subspecies of the glossy swiftlet but was promoted to species status based on the results of a detailed analysis of the swiftlets in the genus Collocalia published in 2017.

There are two subspecies:

- C. s. sumbawae Stresemann, 1925 – Sumbawa, Flores
- C. s. sumbae Schodde, Rheindt & Christidis, 2017 – Sumba

== Description ==
The Tenggara swiftlet is 9–10 cm (3.5–3.9 in) in length with a square tail. The back and upper surface of the wings are dark blue with a moderate gloss. The rump is generally dark but sometimes includes feathers with thin white edging. The throat and upper breast are grey with fine white scalloping merging into larger greyish chevrons over the lower breast and flanks, becoming white over the belly. There is occasionally a tuft of small feathers on the hallux, the rear facing toe. This species lacks the white spots on the inner webs of the tail feathers that are present in some Collocalia species.
