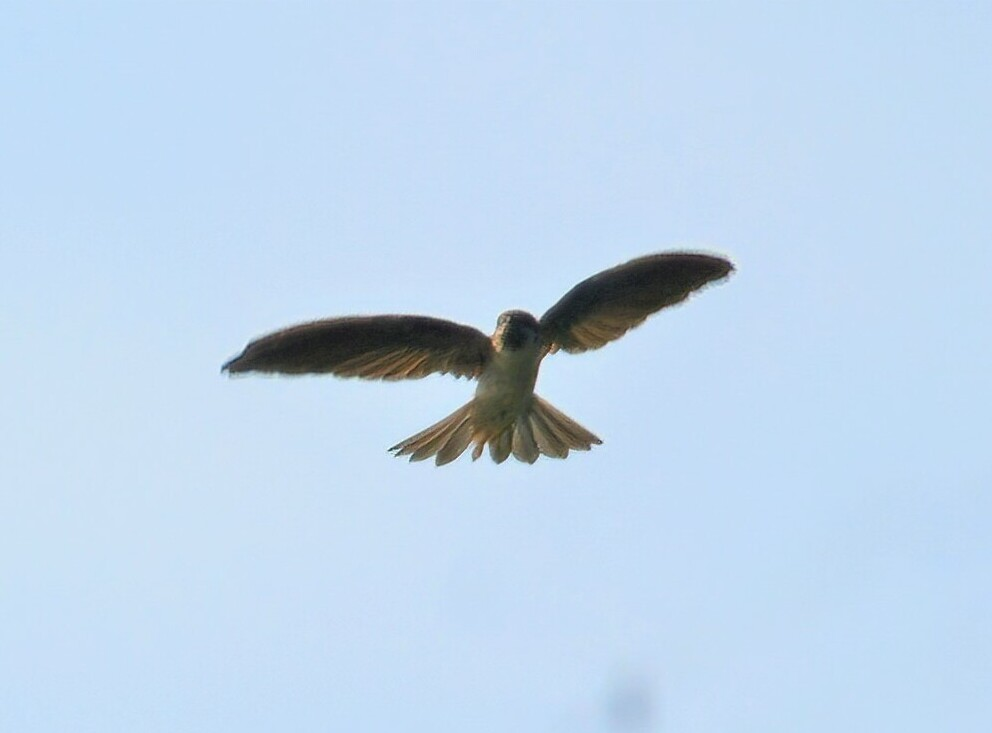

Scientific classification
- Kingdom: Animalia
- Phylum: Chordata
- Class: Aves
- Clade: Strisores
- Order: Apodiformes
- Family: Apodidae
- Genus: Collocalia
- Species: C. neglecta

Binomial name
- Collocalia neglecta Gray, GR, 1866

Synonyms
- Collocalia esculenta neglecta

= Drab swiftlet =

Species of bird

The drab swiftlet (Collocalia neglecta) is a small bird in the swift family Apodidae. It is endemic to the Lesser Sunda Islands in Indonesia. It was formerly treated as a subspecies of the glossy swiftlet.

== Taxonomy ==
The drab swiftlet was described by the English zoologist George Robert Gray in 1866 under the binomial name Collocalia neglecta. The type locality is the island of Timor in the Lesser Sunda Islands. The specific epithet neglecta is from the Latin neglectus meaning "ignored", "overlooked" or "neglected". It was formerly treated as a subspecies of the glossy swiftlet but was raised to species status based on a detailed analysis of the swiftlets in the genus Collocalia published in 2017.

There are two subspecies:

- C. n. neglecta Gray, GR, 1866 – southern Lesser Sunda Islands
- C. n. perneglecta Mayr, 1944 – eastern and central Lesser Sunda Islands

== Description ==
The drab swiftlet is 9–10 cm (3.5–3.9 in) in length with a square tail. It has a satin grayish-blue back with slightly glossy crown and tail. The throat and the upper breast is a mid-gray with a lighter margin to the feathers. The lower breast, flanks and belly are white but the rump is dark. There are dull white spots on the inner webs of the tail feathers. Most birds have a tuft of feathers on the hallux, the rear facing toe. Subspecies perneglecta is darker and has more gloss on the feathers.
