= Bare-legged swiftlet =

Conservation status
- Least Concern (IUCN 3.1)

Scientific classification
- Kingdom: Animalia
- Phylum: Chordata
- Class: Aves
- Clade: Strisores
- Order: Apodiformes
- Family: Apodidae
- Genus: Aerodramus
- Species: A. nuditarsus

Binomial name
- Aerodramus nuditarsus (Salomonsen, 1962)

Synonyms
- Collocalia nuditarsus

Species of bird

The bare-legged swiftlet (Aerodramus nuditarsus) is a species of swift in the family Apodidae. It is found in New Guinea, in subtropical and tropical moist montane forests.
