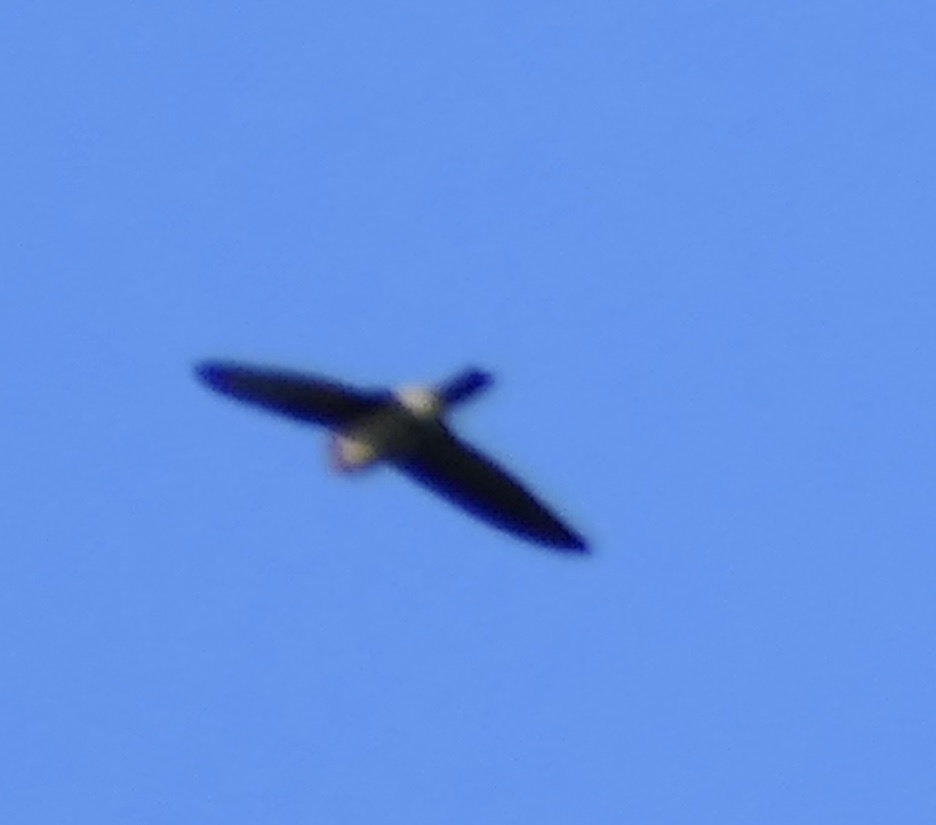

Conservation status
- Least Concern (IUCN 3.1)

Scientific classification
- Kingdom: Animalia
- Phylum: Chordata
- Class: Aves
- Order: Apodiformes
- Family: Apodidae
- Genus: Aerodramus
- Species: A. infuscatus

Binomial name
- Aerodramus infuscatus (Salvadori, 1880)

= Moluccan swiftlet =

Species of bird

The Moluccan swiftlet (Aerodramus infuscatus) is a small bird in the swift family Apodidae that is found on Sulawesi and on the Maluku Islands in Indonesia. Two subspecies, the Sulawesi swiftlet and the Seram swiftlet, have sometimes been considered as separate species.

== Taxonomy ==
The Moluccan swiftlet was formally described in 1880 by the Italian zoologist Tommaso Salvadori under the binomial name Collocalia infuscata based on a specimen collected on the island of Ternate in the Maluku Islands. The specific epithet infuscata is Latin meaning "dusky" from infuscare meaning "to make dark". The Moluccan swiftlet is now one of 25 swiflets placed in the genus Aerodramus that was introduced in 1906 by the American ornithologist Harry C. Oberholser.

Three subspecies are recognised:

- A. i. infuscatus (Salvadori, 1880) – Sangihe Islands and Siau Island (north of northeast Sulawesi) and north Moluccas
- A. i. sororum (Stresemann, 1931) – central, south, southeast Sulawesi and satellites (Sulawesi swiftlet)
- A. i. ceramensis (van Oort, 1911) – Buru and Seram (central Moluccas) (Seram swiftlet)

In 2007 Frank Rheindt and Robert Hutchinson suggested that the subspecies A. i. sororum and A. i. ceramensis differed sufficiently in plumage that they might be better considered as separate species. The proposal to split the Moluccan swiftlet into three species was adopted in the list of world birds maintained on behalf of the International Ornithological Committee (IOC). The nominate subspecies with its restricted distribution was renamed as the Halmahera swiftlet. The decision to split the species was not followed by other ornithologists and in 2024 the IOC reversed their decision and re-lumped the three species.

== Description ==
The Moluccan swiftlet is a small forked tailed swiftlet that is 10 cm (3.9 in) in overall length. It has black-brown upper-parts with a grayish rump band. The underparts are pale brown and the under tail is dark brown. The subspecies sororum has a grey-white rump band 6–7 mm (0.24–0.28 in) in width. The subspecies ceramensis has a broader rump band 10–12 mm (0.39–0.47 in) in width.
