= Three-toed swiftlet =

Conservation status
- Data Deficient (IUCN 3.1)

Scientific classification
- Kingdom: Animalia
- Phylum: Chordata
- Class: Aves
- Clade: Strisores
- Order: Apodiformes
- Family: Apodidae
- Genus: Aerodramus
- Species: A. papuensis

Binomial name
- Aerodramus papuensis (Rand, 1941)

Species of bird

The three-toed swiftlet or Papuan swiftlet (Aerodramus papuensis, formerly Collocalia papuensis) is a species of swift. It is found in New Guinea.
