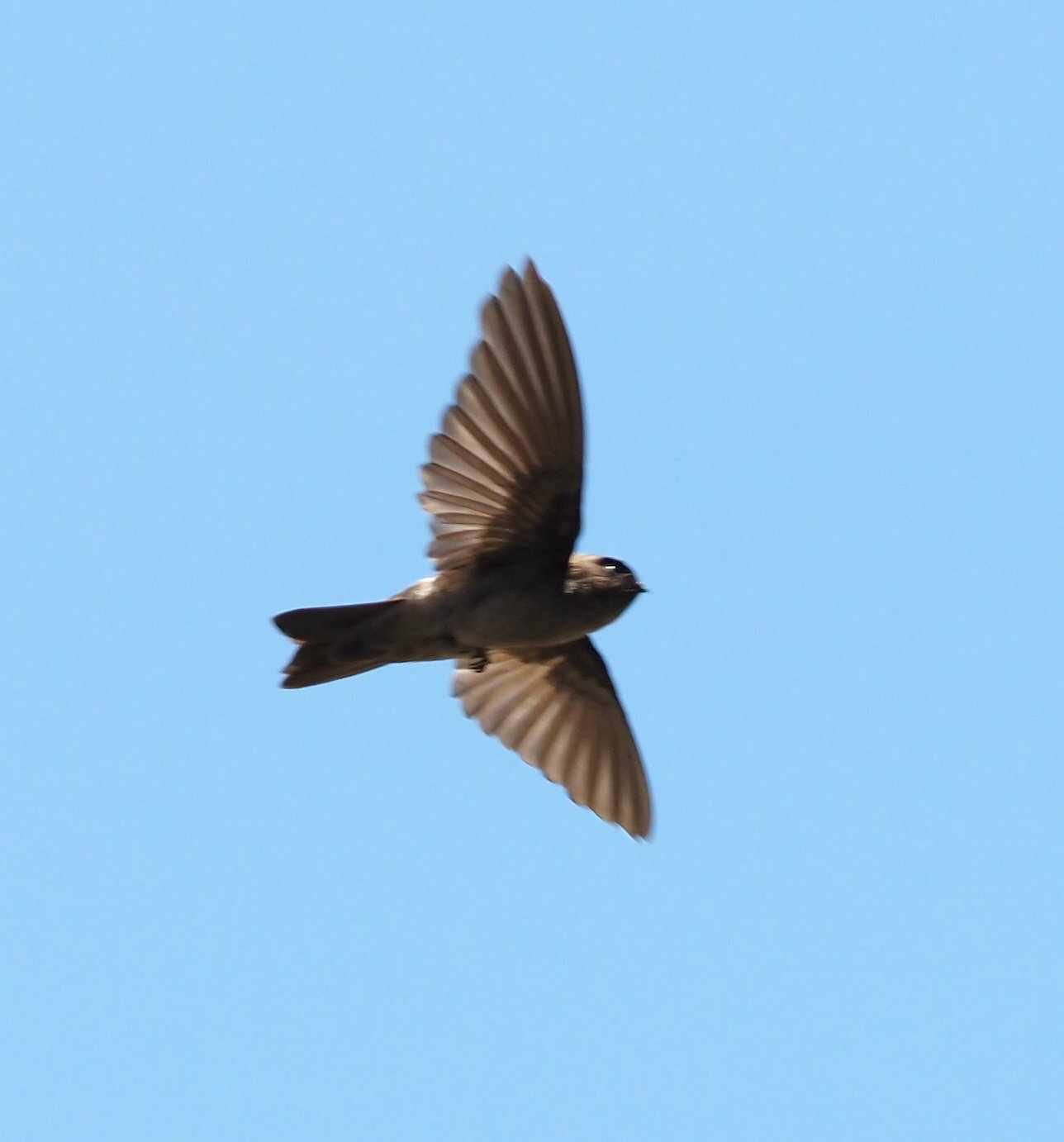

Scientific classification
- Kingdom: Animalia
- Phylum: Chordata
- Class: Aves
- Order: Apodiformes
- Family: Apodidae
- Genus: Aerodramus
- Species: A. ocistus

Binomial name
- Aerodramus ocistus (Oberholser, 1906)

Synonyms
- Collocalia ocista Aerodramus ocista

= Marquesan swiftlet =

Species of bird

The Marquesan swiftlet (Aerodramus ocistus) is a species of swift in the family Apodidae. It is endemic to French Polynesia. Its natural habitat is subtropical or tropical moist lowland forests.

While this species is considered a full species in the IOC World Bird List (version 15.1), the IUCN/BirdLife International treat it as a subspecies (Aerodramus leucophaeus ocistus) of Polynesian swiftlet.
