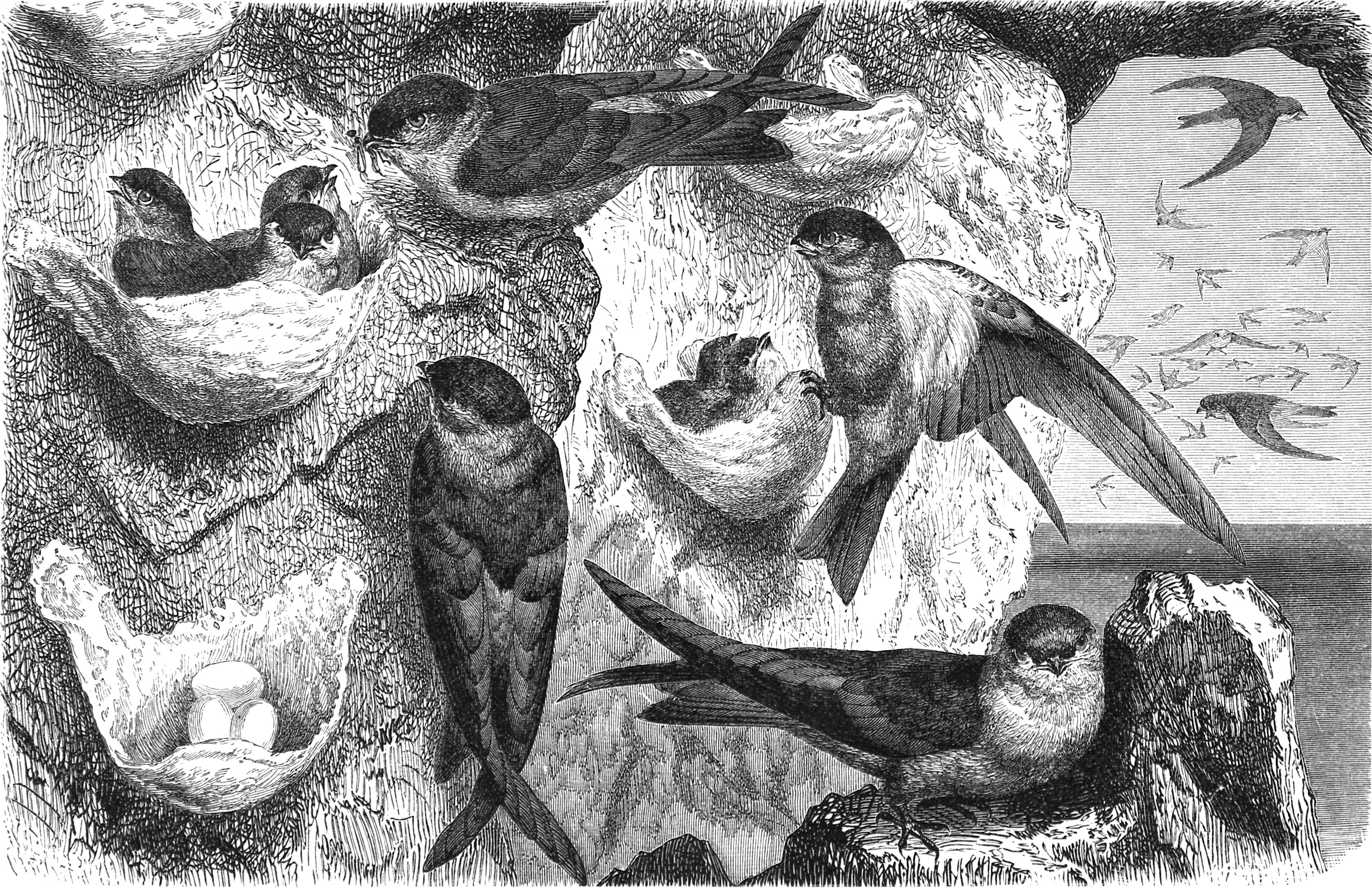
- Glossy swiftlet (Collocalia esculenta)

Scientific classification
- Kingdom: Animalia
- Phylum: Chordata
- Class: Aves
- Order: Apodiformes
- Family: Apodidae
- Tribe: Collocaliini
- Genus: Collocalia; G.R. Gray, 1840

Type species
- Hirundo esculenta Linnaeus, 1758

Species
- See text

= Collocalia =

Collocalia Temporal range: Early Miocene (Altonian)-recent ~19–0 Ma

Genus of birds

Collocalia is a genus of swifts, containing some of the smaller species termed "swiftlets". Formerly a catch-all genus for these, a number of its former members are now normally (though not by all authors) placed in Aerodramus.

== Taxonomy ==
The genus Collocalia was introduced in 1854 by the English zoologist George Robert Gray with Hirundo esculenta Linnaeus, the glossy swiftlet, as the type species. The name Collocalia combines the classical Greek words kolla meaning "glue" and kalia for "nest".

The genus previously contained fewer species. Seven subspecies of the glossy swiftlet were promoted to species status based on a detailed analysis of the swiftlets in the genus Collocalia published in 2017.

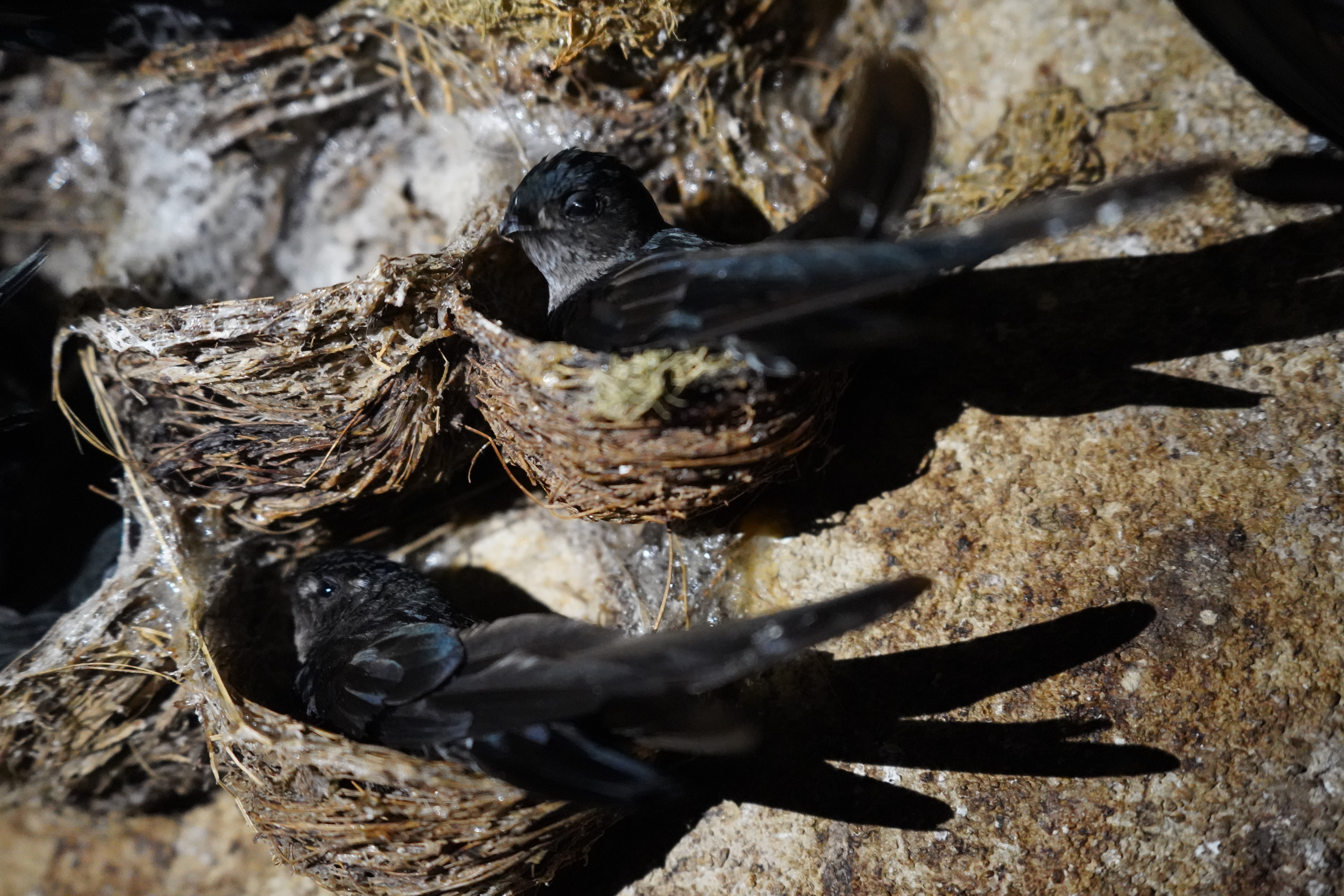
Balinsasayaw birds found in San Pascual, Masbate in the Philippines

== Species ==
=== Extant ===
The genus now contains the following 11 species:

- Plume-toed swiftlet, Collocalia affinis (formerly treated as a subspecies of the glossy swiftlet)
- Grey-rumped swiftlet, Collocalia marginata (formerly treated as a subspecies of the glossy swiftlet)
- Ridgetop swiftlet, Collocalia isonota (formerly treated as a subspecies of the glossy swiftlet)
- Tenggara swiftlet, Collocalia sumbawae (formerly treated as a subspecies of the glossy swiftlet)
- Drab swiftlet, Collocalia neglecta (formerly treated as a subspecies of the glossy swiftlet)
- Glossy swiftlet, Collocalia esculenta
- Satin swiftlet, Collocalia uropygialis (formerly treated as a subspecies of the glossy swiftlet)
- Bornean swiftlet, Collocalia dodgei
- Cave swiftlet, Collocalia linchi
- Christmas Island swiftlet, Collocalia natalis (formerly treated as a subspecies of the glossy swiftlet)
- Pygmy swiftlet, Collocalia troglodytes

=== Fossil species ===
An Early Miocene fossil swiftlet from the Riversleigh deposits of Australia was described as Collocalia buday. This as well as a right ulna (MNZ S42799) found at the Bannockburn Formation of the Manuherikia Group near the Manuherikia River in Otago, New Zealand. Dating from the Early to Middle Miocene (Altonian, 19–16 million years ago), probably belongs to Aerodramus.
