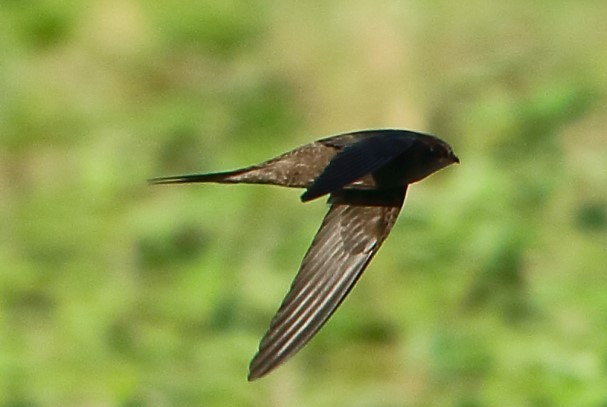
- Schoutedenapus myoptilus in Ngorongoro District, Tanzania

Conservation status
- Least Concern (IUCN 3.1)

Scientific classification
- Kingdom: Animalia
- Phylum: Chordata
- Class: Aves
- Clade: Strisores
- Order: Apodiformes
- Family: Apodidae
- Genus: Schoutedenapus; De Roo, 1968
- Species: S. myoptilus

Binomial name
- Schoutedenapus myoptilus (Salvadori, 1888)

= Scarce swift =

Species of bird

The scarce swift (Schoutedenapus myoptilus) is a species of swift in the family Apodidae. It has a disjunct range of presence throughout the Afromontane : Cameroon line, Albertine Rift montane forests, Kenya, Tanzania, Malawi and Mozambique.

It is the only species in the genus Schoutedenapus. Schouteden's swift (Schoutedenapus schoutedeni) was previously considered a distinct species, but was found to be a darker juvenile or sub-adult scarce swift subspecies chapini.
