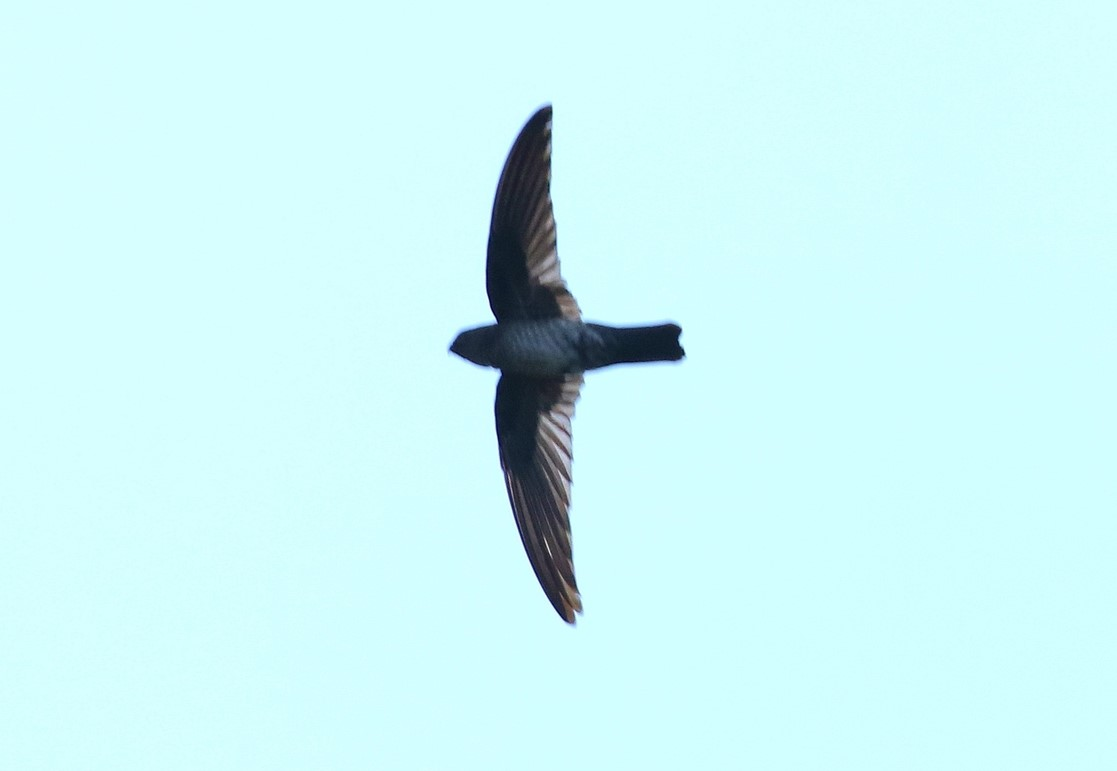

Scientific classification
- Kingdom: Animalia
- Phylum: Chordata
- Class: Aves
- Order: Apodiformes
- Family: Apodidae
- Genus: Collocalia
- Species: C. marginata

Binomial name
- Collocalia marginata Salvadori, 1882

Synonyms
- Collocalia esculenta marginata

= Grey-rumped swiftlet =

Species of bird

The grey-rumped swiftlet (Collocalia marginata) or grey-rumped swiftlet, is a small bird in the swift family Apodidae. It is endemic to the Philippines where it is found on most islands except Mindanao.

Its natural habitat is tropical moist lowland forests. It was previously considered a subspecies of the glossy swiftlet.

== Description ==
The grey-rumped swiftlet is 9–10 cm (3.5–3.9 in) in length with a square tail. The back and upper surface of the wings are dull dark blue with a moderate green gloss. The rump is paler due to the white margins of feathers forming the uppertail coverts. The throat and upper breast are grey with fine white scalloping merging into larger greyish chevrons over the lower breast and flanks, becoming white over the belly. There is sometimes a tuft of small feathers on the hallux, the rear facing toe. This species lacks the white spots on the inner webs of the tail feathers that are present in some Collocalia species.

== Taxonomy ==
The grey-rumped swiftlet was described by the Italian ornithologist Tommaso Salvadori in 1882 and given the current binomial name Collocalia marginata. The type locality is the island of Cebu in the Philippines. The specific epithet maginata is Latin for "bordered" or "edged". The grey-rumped swiftlet was previously treated as a subspecies of the glossy swiftlet but was promoted to species status based on the results of a detailed analysis of the swiftlets in the genus Collocalia published in 2017.

There are two subspecies:

- C. m. septentrionalis Mayr, 1945 – Babuyan Island, Cagayan Island, Camiguin Island
- C. m. marginata Salvadori, 1882 – eastern and western Visayan Islands, possibly Palawan

== Ecology and behavior ==
It feeds small insects in flight. Forms groups of up to 40 individuals associating with other swiftlets.

Average clutch is just 1 single egg. Not much else is known about its breeding.

== Habitat and conservation ==
Seen in almost any habitat including coastal areas, montane forest, agricultural lands and even roads. It is still most frequently seen in forests and clearings.

International Union for Conservation of Nature does not yet recognize this as its own species. It has assessed its parent species, the glossy swiftlet as least-concern species.
