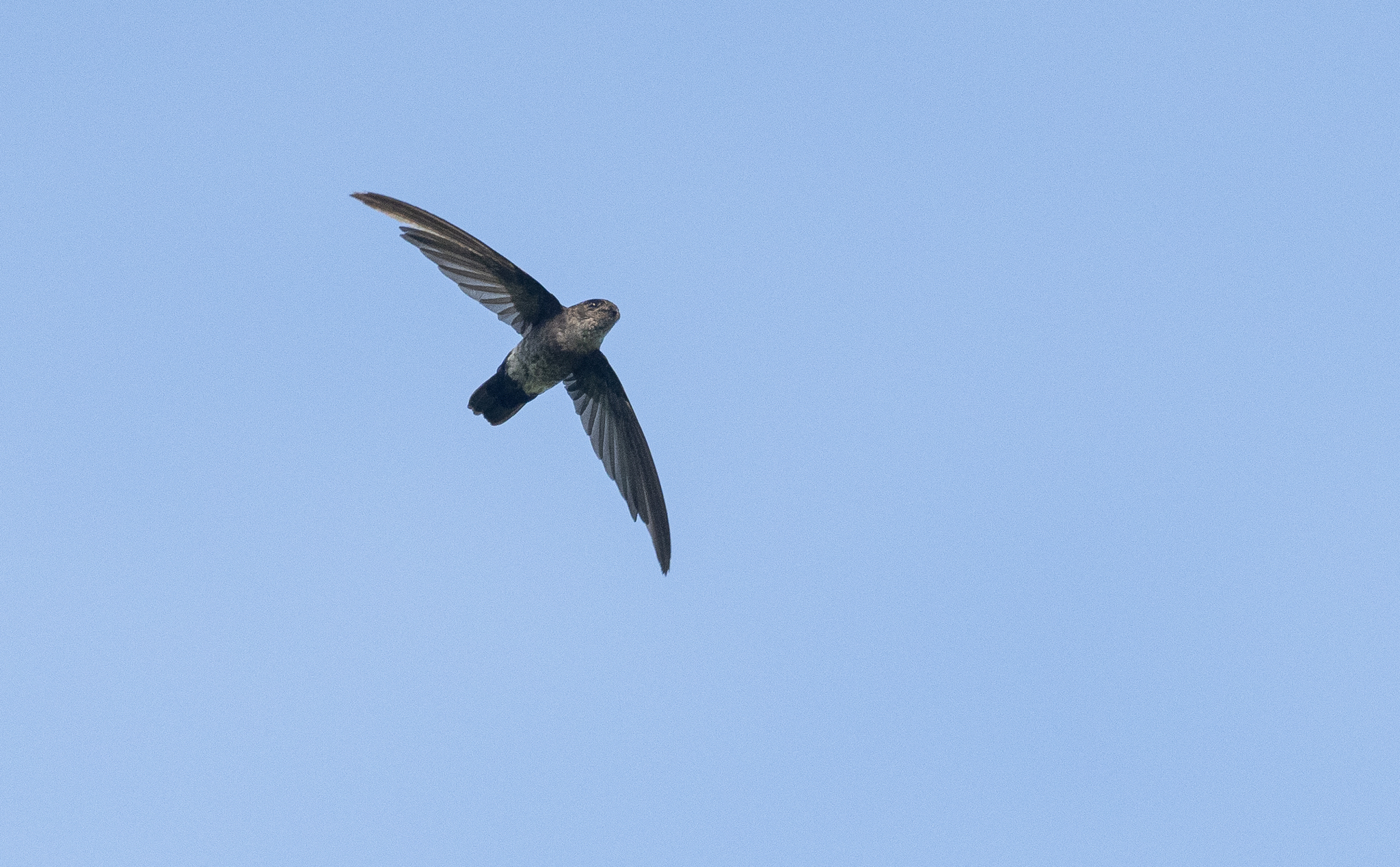

Conservation status
- Least Concern (IUCN 3.1)

Scientific classification
- Kingdom: Animalia
- Phylum: Chordata
- Class: Aves
- Clade: Strisores
- Order: Apodiformes
- Family: Apodidae
- Genus: Collocalia
- Species: C. troglodytes

Binomial name
- Collocalia troglodytes Gray, GR, 1845

= Pygmy swiftlet =

Species of bird

The pygmy swiftlet (Collocalia troglodytes) is a species of swift in the family Apodidae. It is endemic to the Philippines.

Its natural habitat is tropical moist lowland forests. At under 9 cm (3.5 in), it is the world's smallest swift. It weighs only 5 grams.

== Description and taxonomy ==
This species is monotypic.

== Ecology and behavior ==
It feeds small insects in flight. Forms small groups when foraging.

Swiftlets that nest in complete darkness in caves can use echolocation, the ability to position an object by reflected sound, used by other animals such as dolphins and bats. Breeding season varies per island but usually within the window from May to September

== Habitat and conservation ==
This is a lowland species thats mostly found near forest and bodies of water.

International Union for Conservation of Nature has assessed this species as a least-concern species as it has a large range and is common. However, it has a declining population due to deforestation from land conversion, Illegal logging and slash-and-burn farming.
