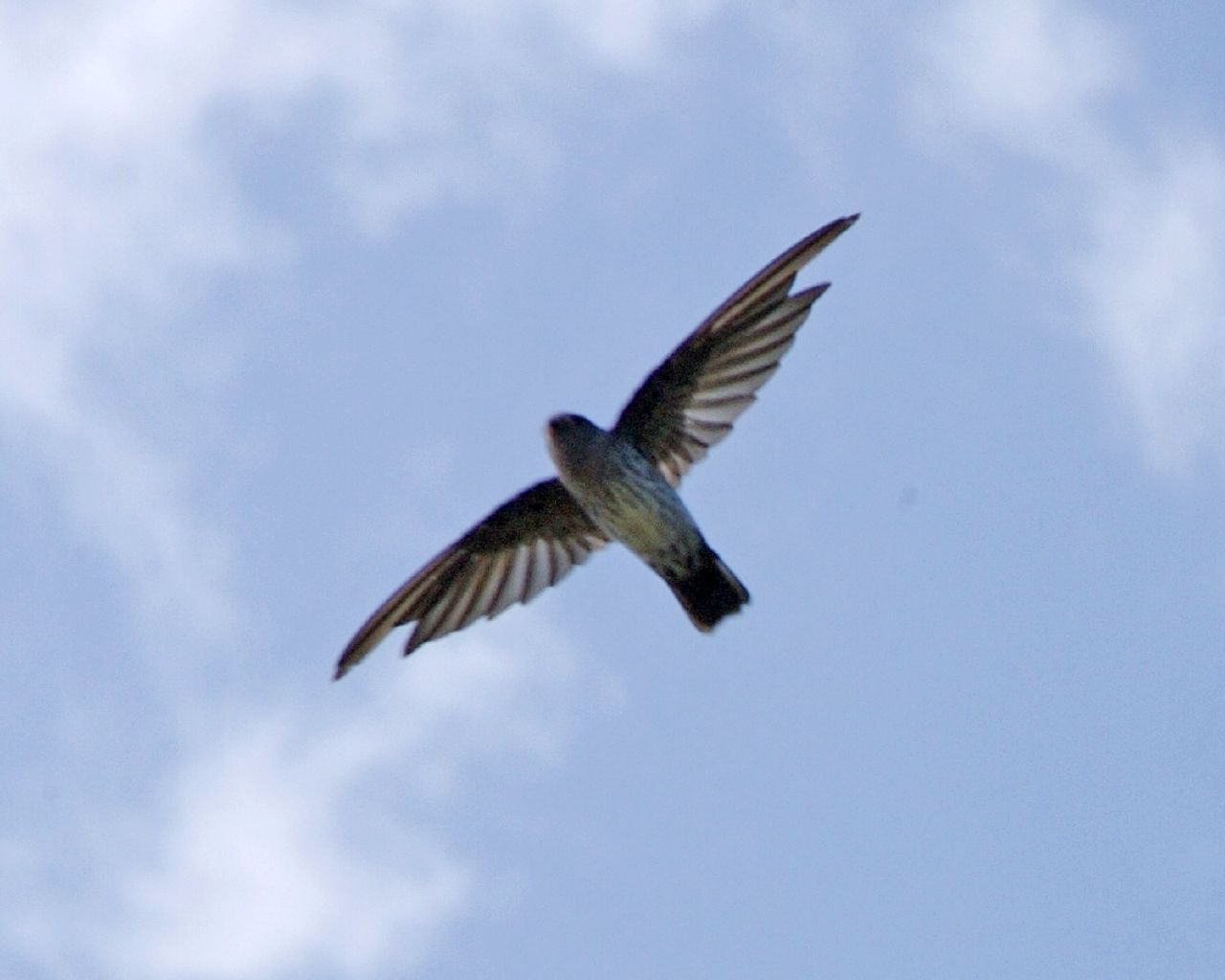

Conservation status
- Least Concern (IUCN 3.1)

Scientific classification
- Kingdom: Animalia
- Phylum: Chordata
- Class: Aves
- Order: Apodiformes
- Family: Apodidae
- Genus: Collocalia
- Species: C. linchi

Binomial name
- Collocalia linchi Horsfield & Moore, F, 1854

= Linchi swiftlet =

Species of bird

The linchi swiftlet (Collocalia linchi), also known as the cave swiftlet, is a species of swift in the family Apodidae. It is found on the Indonesia islands of Sumatra, Java and Bali. It is a woodland species and nests in caves. The Bornean swiftlet was considered a subspecies, but is now usually considered distinct.

== Taxonomy ==
The linchi swiftlet was described by the naturalists Thomas Horsfield and Frederic Moore in 1854 under the present binomial name Collocalia linchi. The specific epithet linchi is the Javanese word for a swiftlet.

There are four recognised subspecies:

- C. l. dedii Somadikarta, 1986 - Bali and Lombok
- C. l. linchi Horsfield & Moore, F, 1854 - Bawean and Java
- C. l. ripleyi Somadikarta, S, 1986 - Barisan Mountains, Sumatra
- ~~C. l. dodgei Richmond, 1905 - Mt Kinabalu (Sabah), in N Borneo.~~ (now a full species: Collocalia dodgei)

== Description ==
This bird is shiny blackish-brown above with a greenish gloss, including its rump; sometimes looks black and hooded. Chest black; belly to flanks pale grey with fine black speckles at margins. Wing tips are rounded; underwing is black. Tail black, rounded with shallow notch but lacking the white specks found in the very similar glossy swiftlet (Collocalia esculenta). A distinguishing feature between the two species is that the glossy swiftlet has a tuft of feathers on its hind toe but the linchi swiftlet has a naked toe. It is 9 to 11.5 cm (3.5 to 4.5 in) in length. The call is a high-pitched "cheer-cheer".

== Distribution and habitat ==
The linchi swiftlet is native to Malaysia and Indonesia. It is found in the Sundaic region, in Java, Madura Island, Bawean, Kangean Island, Nusa Penida, Bali and Lombok, parts of Sumatra, and the western slopes of Mount Kinabalu on Sabah, Borneo. Evidence of it occurring in Malaysia rests on a single specimen in the British Museum labelled "Molacca". Its natural habitat is lowland and upland forest and open woodland.

== Behaviour ==
The linchi swiftlet is highly gregarious and flies with all the other species of swift that are sympatric with it. It often circles and flies through the branches of trees emerging through the canopy such as fruiting figs. It breeds in the lighter parts of caves, building a nest of stringy vegetation and cementing the materials to the rock with saliva. Two white, somewhat elongated eggs are laid.

== Status ==
The linchi swiftlet has a very wide range and is common in Java and the nearby islands. It has no particular threats and the IUCN has listed it as being of "Least Concern". Although the overall population may be declining slightly, this is not believed to be at such a rate as would justify listing it in a more threatened category.
