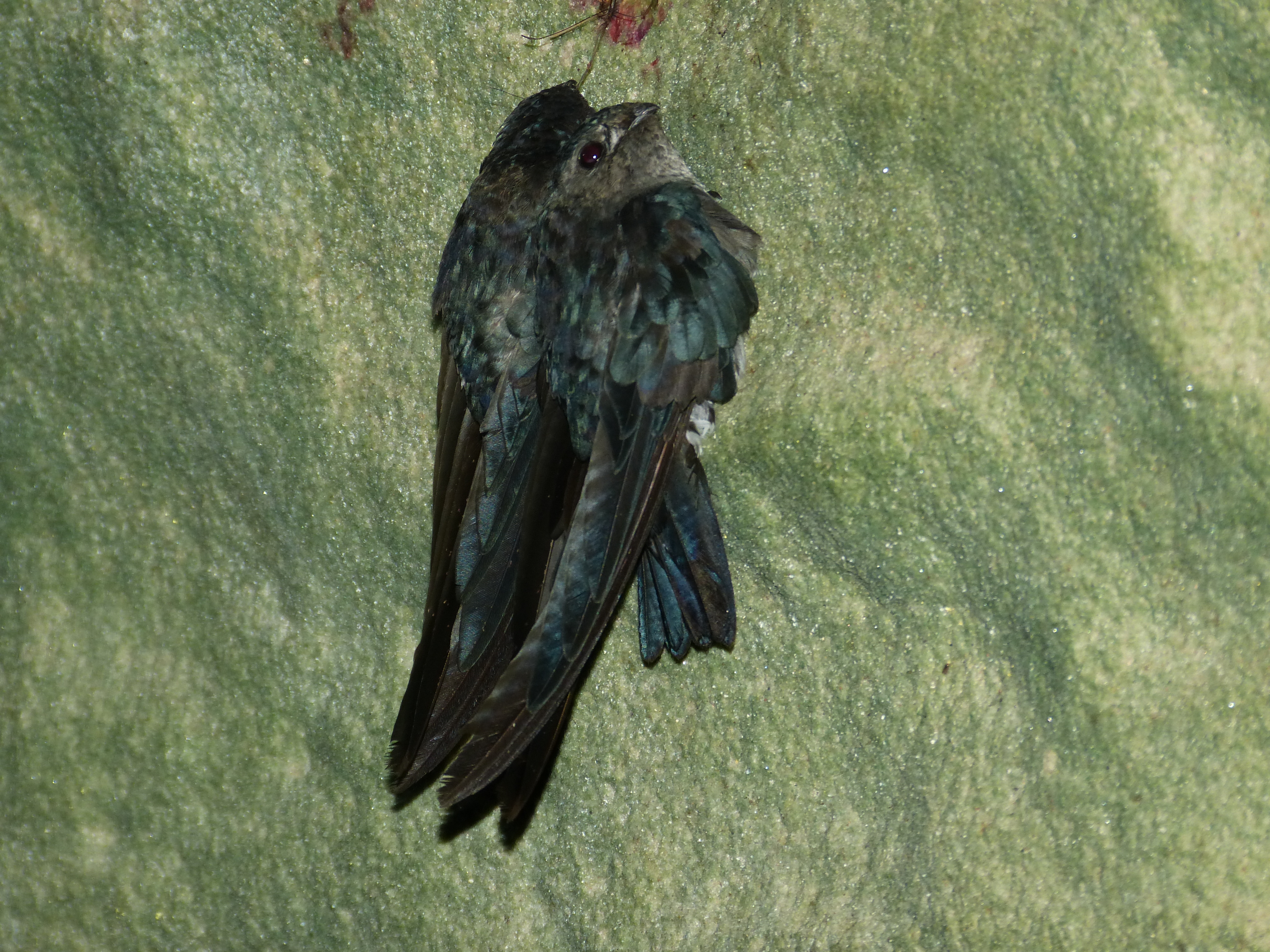

Conservation status
- Least Concern (IUCN 3.1)

Scientific classification
- Kingdom: Animalia
- Phylum: Chordata
- Class: Aves
- Clade: Strisores
- Order: Apodiformes
- Family: Apodidae
- Genus: Collocalia
- Species: C. esculenta

Binomial name
- Collocalia esculenta (Linnaeus, 1758)

Synonyms
- Hirundo esculenta Linnaeus, 1758

= Glossy swiftlet =

Species of bird

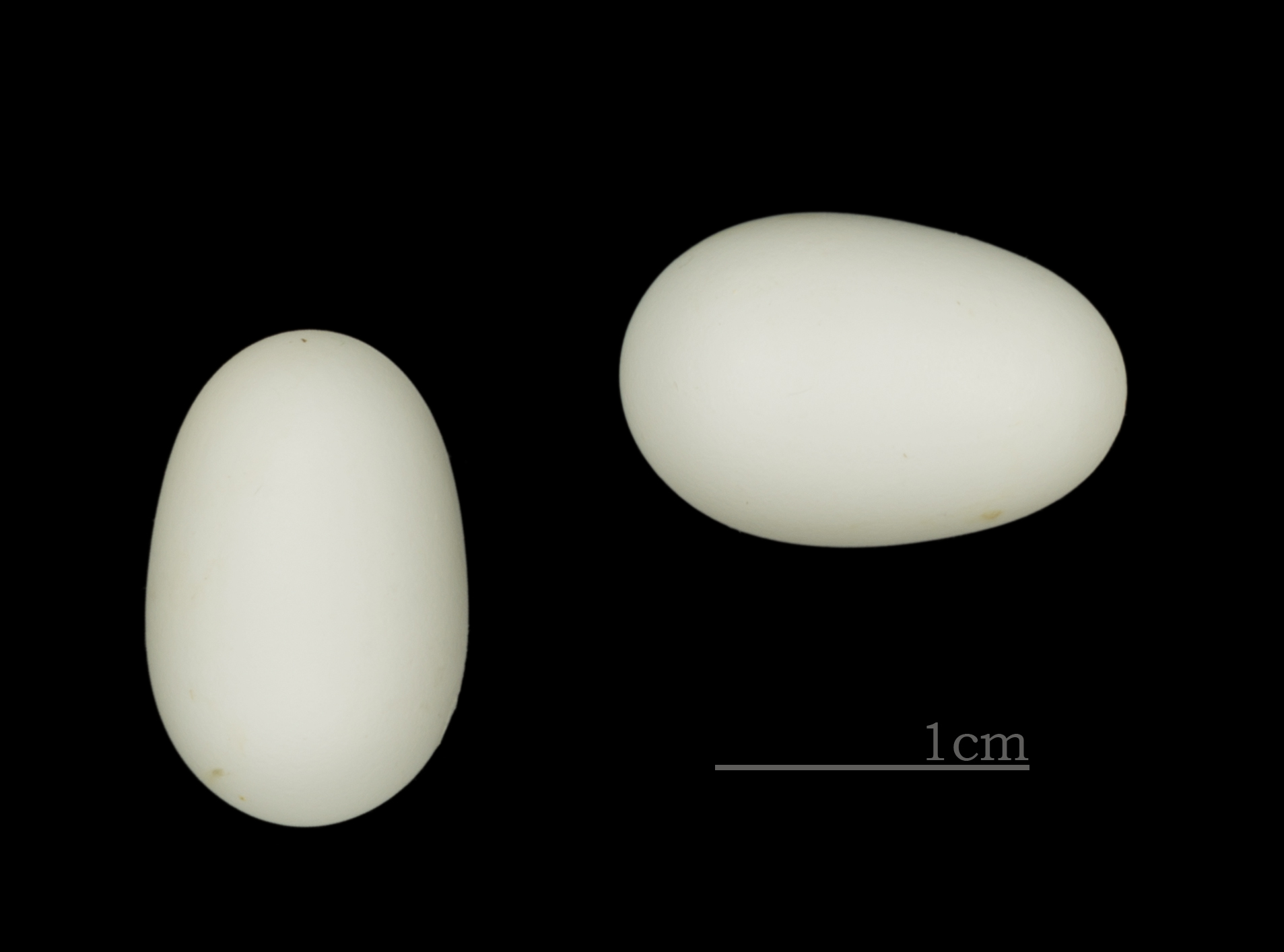
Eggs of Collocalia esculenta MHNT

The glossy swiftlet (Collocalia esculenta) is a species of swift in the family Apodidae. It is found on the Indonesian island of Sulawesi and eastwards to New Guinea, the Bismarck Archipelago and the Solomon Islands.

== Taxonomy ==
The glossy swiftlet was described by the Swedish naturalist Carl Linnaeus in 1758 in the tenth edition of his Systema Naturae under the binomial name Hirundo esculenta. The type locality is Ambon Island, one of the Maluku Islands of Indonesia. The specific epithet esculenta is from esculentus the Latin word for "edible".

There are 17 recognised subspecies:

- C. e. minuta Stresemann, 1925 – Tanahjampea (Paula Jampea) and Kalao Island (in the Flores Sea south of Sulawesi)
- C. e. esculenta (Linnaeus, 1758) – central and southern Sulawesi through Banggai and Sula Islands to central and southern Maluku Islands (possibly Aru Islands)
- C. e. manadensis Salomonsen, 1983 – northern Sulawesi to Sangihe Islands and the Talaud Islands
- C. e. spilura Gray, GR, 1866 – northern Maluku Islands
- C. e. amethystina Salomonsen, 1983 – Waigeo Island (off northwestern New Guinea)
- C. e. numforensis Salomonsen, 1983 – island of Numfor (off northwestern New Guinea)
- C. e. nitens Ogilvie-Grant, 1914 – New Guinea, western Papuan islands, the island of Yapen (in Cenderawasih Bay) and Karkar Island (off the northeast coast of Papua New Guinea)
- C. e. misimae Salomonsen, 1983 – Louisiade Archipelago, Trobriand Islands and Woodlark Island, (possibly D'Entrecasteaux Islands)
- C. e. tametamele Stresemann, 1921 – New Britain, Long, Vitu Islands and Tolokiwa Island (Bismarck Archipelago)
- C. e. stresemanni Rothschild & Hartert, 1914 – Admiralty Islands
- C. e. heinrothi Neumann, 1919 – New Ireland, New Hanover Island and Dyaul Island (central Bismarck Archipelago)
- C. e. spilogaster Salomonsen, 1983 – Tabar Island and the Lihir Group (northeastern Bismarck Archipelago)
- C. e. hypogrammica Salomonsen, 1983 – Nissan Island (northwest of Bougainville Island)
- C. e. lagonoleucos Schodde, Rheindt, & Christidis, 2017 – Buka, Bougainville, Shortland Islands (northwest Solomon Islands)
- C. e. becki Mayr, 1931 – central and northeastern Solomon Islands
- C. e. makirensis Mayr, 1931 – Makira (San Cristóbal Island) (southeastern Solomon Islands)
- C. e. desiderata Mayr, 1931 – Rennell Island (southern Solomon Islands)

Seven taxa that are now recognised as species were previously considered as subspecies of the glossy swiftlet. They were raised to species status based on a detailed analysis of the swiftlets in the genus Collocalia published in 2017. The promoted taxa are:

- Plume-toed swiftlet (Collocalia affinis)
- Grey-rumped swiftlet (Collocalia marginata)
- Ridgetop swiftlet (Collocalia isonota)
- Tenggara swiftlet (Collocalia sumbawae)
- Drab swiftlet (Collocalia neglecta)
- Satin swiftlet (Collocalia uropygialis)
- Christmas Island swiftlet (Collocalia natalis)

== Description ==
This bird is shiny black-blue above, including its rump; sometimes looks black and hooded. Chest black; belly to flanks white with fine black speckles at margins. Wing tips are rounded; underwing is black. Tail rounded with shallow notch and tiny white panels. It is so similar to the white-rumped swiftlet that both its upperparts and underparts must be seen to distinguish between the two. It is 9 to 11.5 cm (3.5 to 4.5 in) in length. Its voice is a soft twittering.

== Behaviour ==
The glossy swiftlet nests inside caves and buildings, creating a nest on a vertical or under a horizontal surface by secreting a sticky gel and attaching a kind of string-like grass to the surface. It is seen flying over forests, streams, rivers and roads catching insects in flight.

Glossy swiftlets have been considered as possible foster parents for restoring the population of the endangered edible-nest swiftlet in the Andaman Islands.

== Distribution ==
The glossy swiftlet is known from Indonesia, Timor, Brunei, Christmas Island, Philippines, Papua New Guinea, the Solomon Islands, Vanuatu and New Caledonia. It is a vagrant to Australia. It is not a migrant.

== Status ==
The glossy swiftlet is reported as being abundant in at least part of the range. It faces no particular threats, and as a result, the IUCN has listed it as being of "Least Concern".
