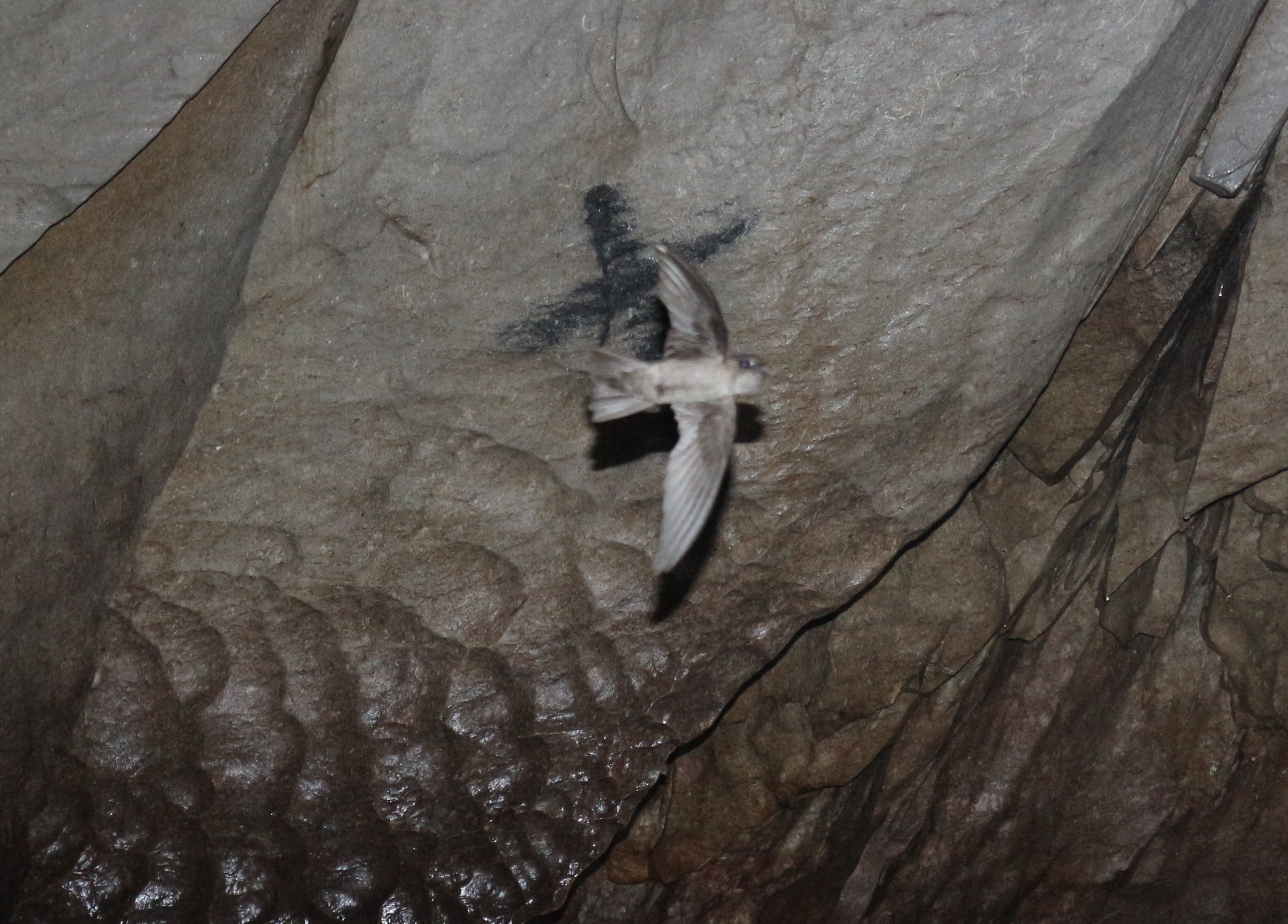
- Photo of the "A. a. palawanesis", one of its subspecies

Conservation status
- Least Concern (IUCN 3.1)

Scientific classification
- Kingdom: Animalia
- Phylum: Chordata
- Class: Aves
- Order: Apodiformes
- Family: Apodidae
- Genus: Aerodramus
- Species: A. amelis

Binomial name
- Aerodramus amelis (Oberholser, 1906)

Synonyms
- Collocalia vanikorensis amelis

= Ameline swiftlet =

Species of bird

The Ameline swiftlet (Aerodramus amelis), also known as the grey swiftlet, is a small bird in the swift family Apodidae. It is endemic to the Philippines. Its natural habitat is tropical moist lowland forests. It was formerly considered as a subspecies of the uniform swiftlet. Despite some fears around conservation, the species remains a Least-concern species.

== Description and taxonomy ==
=== Subspecies ===
Two subspecies are recognised:

- A. a. amelis (Oberholser, 1906) – Philippines (except Palawan group)
- A. a. palawanensis (Stresemann, 1914) – Palawan group and Balambangan Island (north of northeast Borneo)

== Ecology and behavior ==
It feeds small insects in flight. Forms groups of up to 40 individuals associating with other swiftlets.

Typically nests in dark caves. Nest is round, composted of plant matter, moss and saliva. Average clutch is just 1-2 eggs. Not much else is known about its breeding

== Habitat and conservation ==
It is found in a wide range of habitat including coastal areas, forest and agricultural lands and grassland.

International Union for Conservation of Nature does not yet recognize this as its own species. It has assessed its parent species, the Uniform swiftlet as least-concern species.
