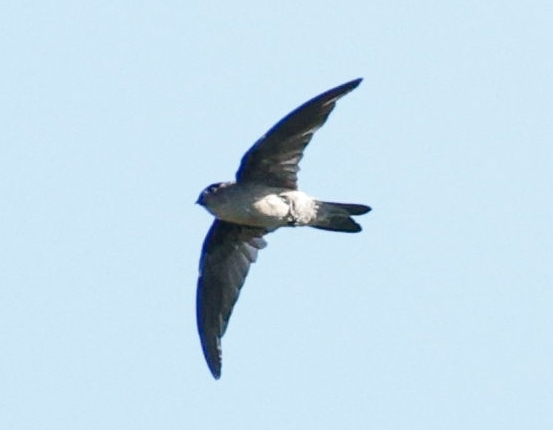

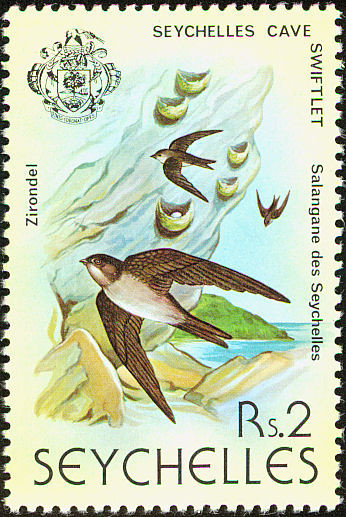
- Seychelles swiftlet on a 1979 stamp of Seychelles

Conservation status
- Vulnerable (IUCN 3.1)

Scientific classification
- Kingdom: Animalia
- Phylum: Chordata
- Class: Aves
- Order: Apodiformes
- Family: Apodidae
- Genus: Aerodramus
- Species: A. elaphrus

Binomial name
- Aerodramus elaphrus (Oberholser, 1906)

Synonyms
- Collocalia elaphra

= Seychelles swiftlet =

Species of bird

The Seychelles swiftlet (Aerodramus elaphrus) is a small bird of the swift family. It is found only in the Seychelles Islands in the Indian Ocean.

It is 10–12 cm long with a wingspan of 28 cm and a weight of about 10 g. The upperparts are dark grey-brown and are slightly paler on the rump. The underparts are pale grey-brown, darkest on the undertail-coverts. The bill and legs are black. The tail is dark and slightly forked. The wings are long and narrow but are less pointed than those of the other swift species which sometimes visit the islands.

A soft, twittering call is given in flight by feeding flocks and the birds also have a low-pitched, metallic clicking call used for echolocation in caves.

The Seychelles swiftlet is related to the smaller, paler Mascarene swiftlet (Aerodramus francicus) of Mauritius and Réunion and has been treated as a subspecies of it in the past. The two are thought to have separated about 500,000 years ago.

The Seychelles swiftlet breeds on the islands of Mahé, Praslin and La Digue. It formerly bred on Félicité and has been recorded as a non-breeding visitor on Aride. It often feeds over freshwater and mountain passes but can be seen over most habitats. It feeds on flying insects, particularly ants.

Breeding takes place all year round at a small number of colonies in caves. The nest is bracket-shaped and made of strands of lichen and casuarina needles held together by saliva. One white egg is laid and is incubated for about 25 to 30 days. The young birds are fed by both parents and fledge after 42 days.

The species is classified as Vulnerable by the IUCN due to its small population (2,500 to 3,000 birds) and limited number of breeding sites. Threats include disturbance, use of insecticides and predation by introduced barn owls and cats.
