= Mangaia swiftlet =

Mangaia swiftlet Temporal range: Late Holocene

Conservation status
- Extinct (IUCN 3.1)

Scientific classification
- Kingdom: Animalia
- Phylum: Chordata
- Class: Aves
- Order: Apodiformes
- Family: Apodidae
- Genus: Aerodramus
- Species: †A. manuoi

Binomial name
- †Aerodramus manuoi Steadman, 2002

Synonyms
- Collocalia manuoi

Extinct species of bird

The Mangaia swiftlet (Aerodramus manuoi) is an extinct species of bird in the swift family. It became extinct during prehistoric times. It was endemic to Mangaia in the Cook Islands. It was closely allied with the extant Atiu swiftlet (Aerodramus sawtelli) of Atiu, Mangaia's neighbouring island, though it was probably slightly larger.

It was described from six fossil bones recovered from a Holocene rock shelter deposit on Mangaia. The coracoid and carpometacarpus of the new species are larger and very different qualitatively from those of the Atiu species. This is the first species of Aerodramus to be described from fossils.
