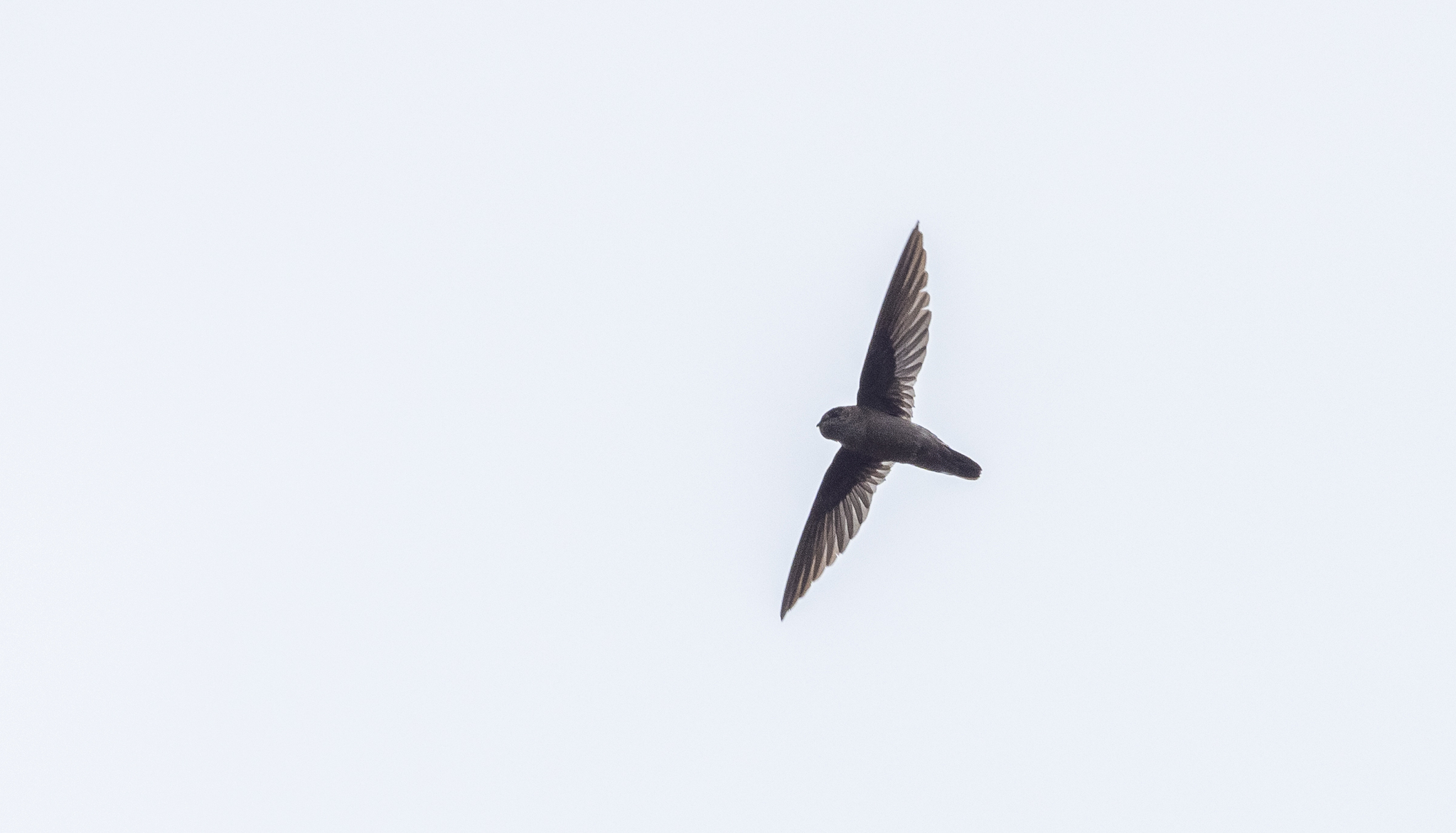

Conservation status
- Least Concern (IUCN 3.1)

Scientific classification
- Kingdom: Animalia
- Phylum: Chordata
- Class: Aves
- Order: Apodiformes
- Family: Apodidae
- Genus: Aerodramus
- Species: A. mearnsi

Binomial name
- Aerodramus mearnsi (Oberholser, 1912)

= Philippine swiftlet =

Species of bird

The Philippine swiftlet (Aerodramus mearnsi, formerly Collocalia mearnsi) is a species of swift in the family Apodidae. It is endemic to the Philippines.

Its natural habitats are or tropical dry forests, tropical moist lowland forests, and tropical moist montane forests.

== Description and taxonomy ==
This species is monotypic.

== Ecology and behavior ==
Diet is unknown but it is presumed to have the typical diet of insects caught in flight. Nests consist of moss held together with saliva which does not remain moist but hardens. Breeds in May in Mindoro. Nests in caves and rock cavities. The nest is made of moss held together with saliva, where it lays four eggs. Breeding has been recorded in May in Mindoro.

== Habitat and conservation status ==
Its natural habitats are tropical submontane forests beginning at 700 meters above sea level.

It is listed as Least-concern species by the International Union for Conservation of Nature with the population believed to be stable.
