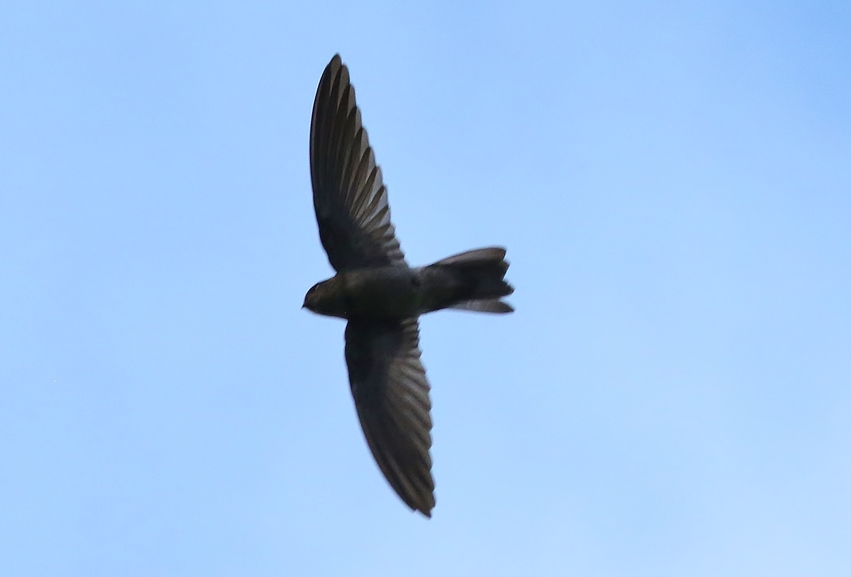

Conservation status
- Least Concern (IUCN 3.1)

Scientific classification
- Kingdom: Animalia
- Phylum: Chordata
- Class: Aves
- Clade: Strisores
- Order: Apodiformes
- Family: Apodidae
- Genus: Aerodramus
- Species: A. inquietus

Binomial name
- Aerodramus inquietus (Kittlitz, 1858)

Synonyms
- Collocalia inquietus Collocalia inquieta Collocalia vanikorensis inquietus Aerodramus vanikorensis inquietus

= Caroline swiftlet =

Species of bird

The Caroline swiftlet (Aerodramus inquietus), also known as the island swiftlet, Micronesian swiftlet, or Caroline Islands swiftlet, is a species of swift in the family Apodidae. Some taxonomists consider it to be a subspecies of the uniform swiftlet. It is endemic to the Caroline Islands, and its natural habitat is subtropical or tropical moist lowland forests.
