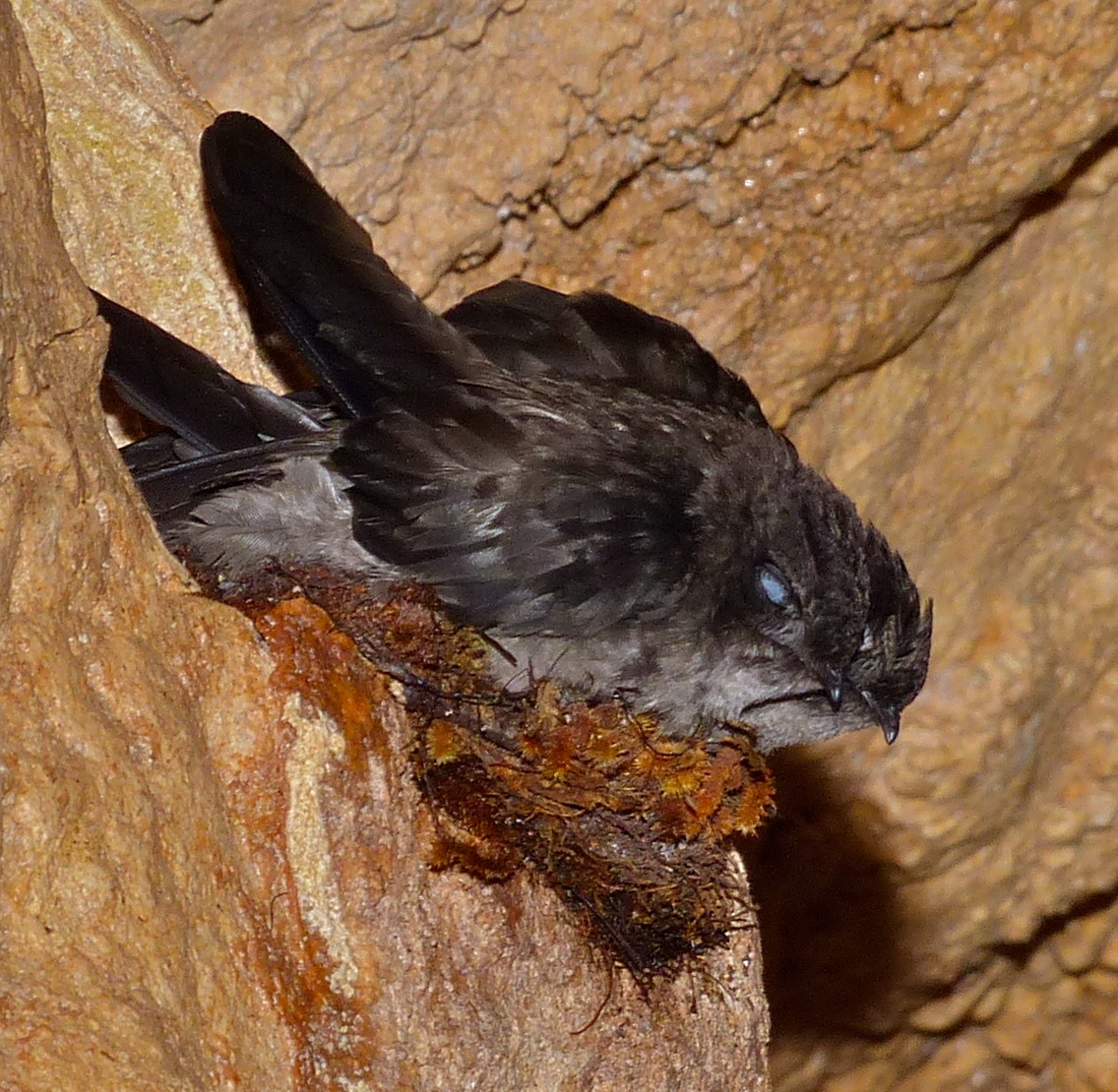

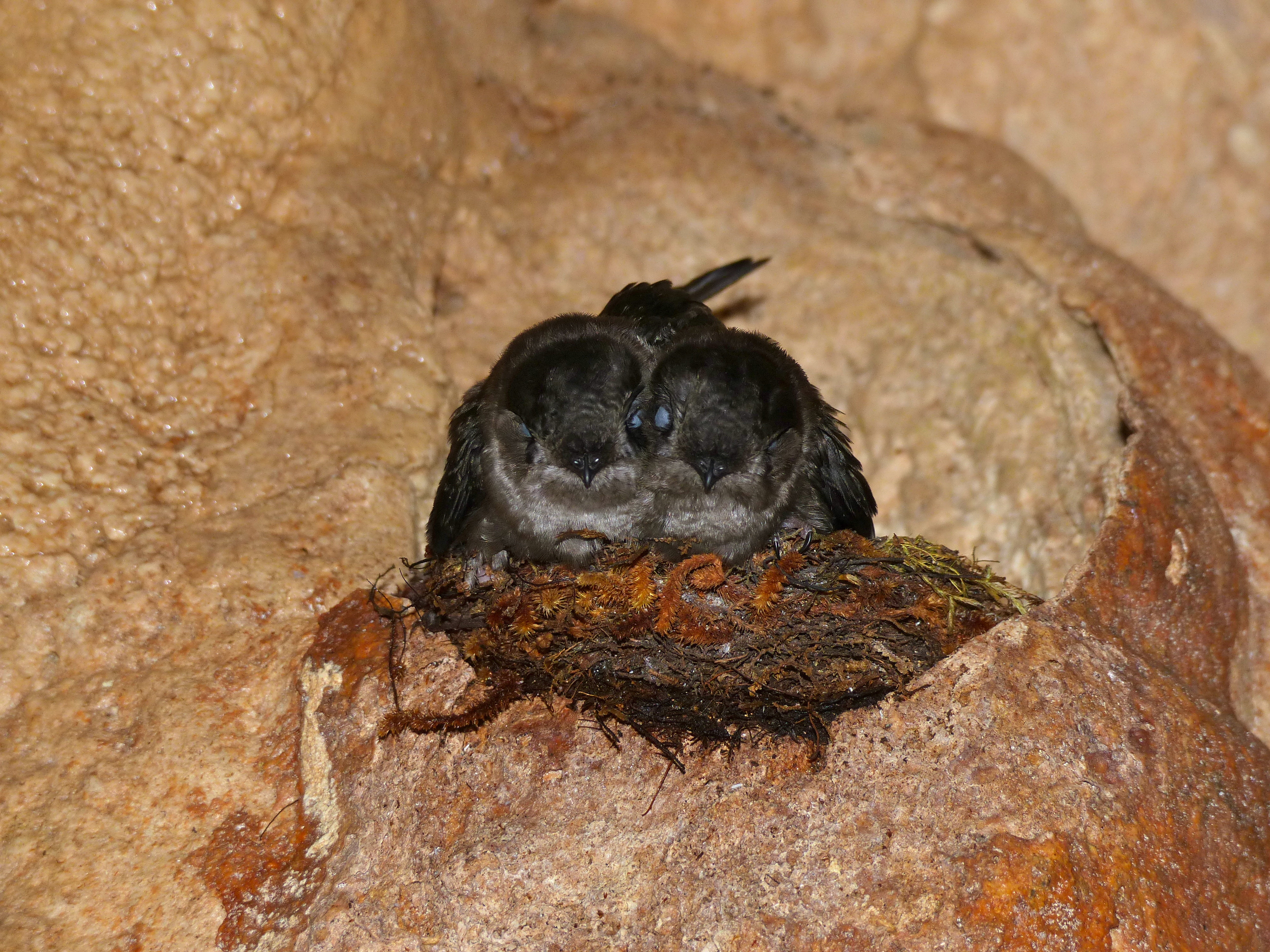

Conservation status
- Least Concern (IUCN 3.1)

Scientific classification
- Kingdom: Animalia
- Phylum: Chordata
- Class: Aves
- Clade: Strisores
- Order: Apodiformes
- Family: Apodidae
- Genus: Aerodramus
- Species: A. salangana

Binomial name
- Aerodramus salangana (Streubel, 1848)

Synonyms
- Collocalia salangana

= Mossy-nest swiftlet =

Species of bird

The mossy-nest swiftlet (Aerodramus salangana) is a species of swift in the family Apodidae. Some taxonomists consider it to be a subspecies of the uniform swiftlet. It is found in northern Borneo, the Natuna and the Derawan Islands and Nias island off western Sumatra. Its natural habitat is subtropical or tropical moist lowland forests.

== Sources ==
- BirdLife International 2004. Aerodramus salangana. 2006 IUCN Red List of Threatened Species. Downloaded on 24 July 2007.
