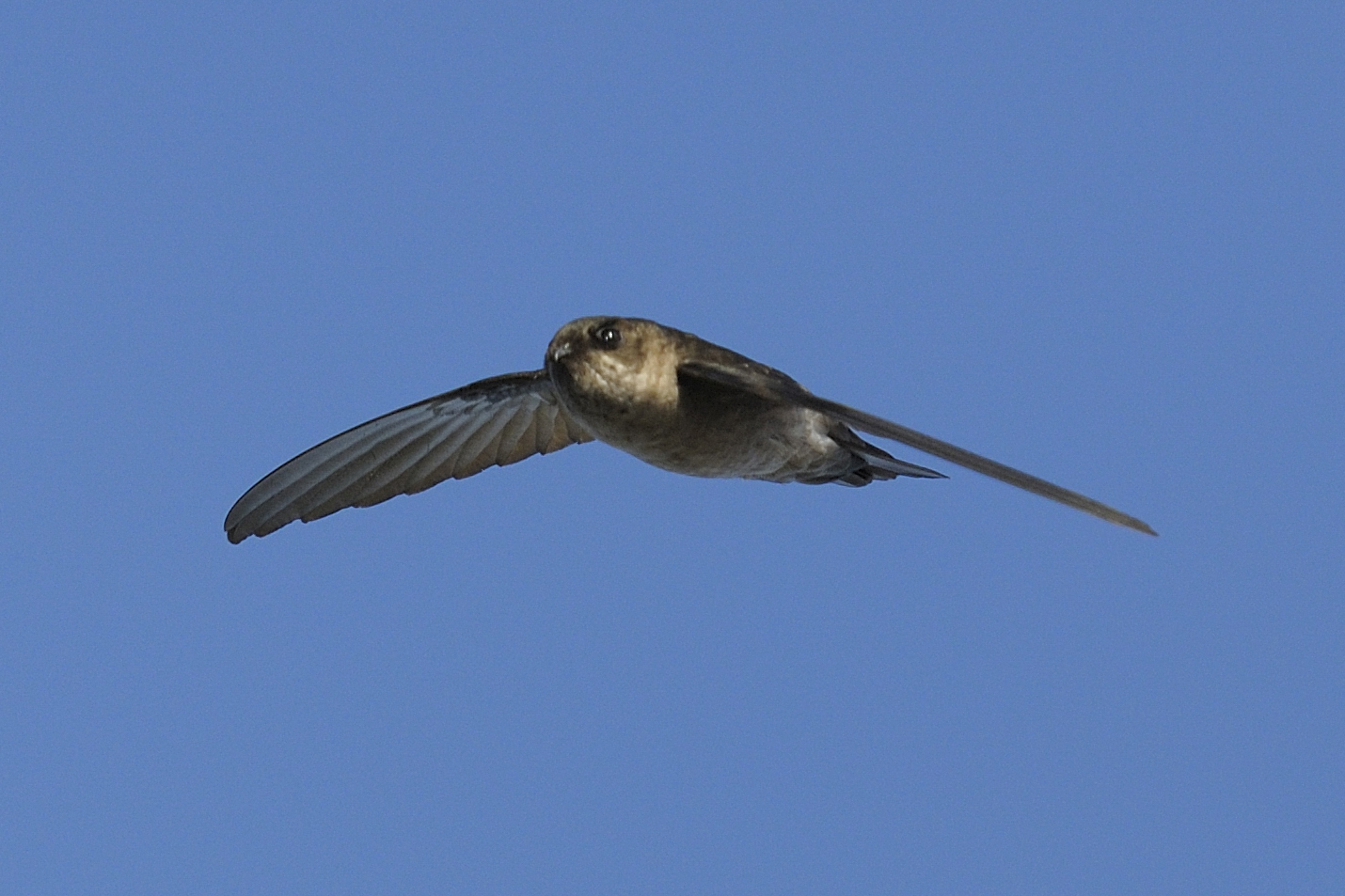

Conservation status
- Near Threatened (IUCN 3.1)

Scientific classification
- Kingdom: Animalia
- Phylum: Chordata
- Class: Aves
- Clade: Strisores
- Order: Apodiformes
- Family: Apodidae
- Genus: Aerodramus
- Species: A. francicus

Binomial name
- Aerodramus francicus (Gmelin, JF, 1789)

Synonyms
- Collocalia francica

= Mascarene swiftlet =

Species of bird

The Mascarene swiftlet or Mauritius swiftlet (Aerodramus francicus) is a species of swift in the family Apodidae. It is found in Mauritius and Réunion, and the populations on the two islands have recently been confirmed to differ subspecifically. The nominate race francicus is found on Mauritius, and the recently described race saffordi occurs on Réunion.

Its natural habitats are subtropical or tropical moist lowland forest, subtropical or tropical high-altitude shrubland, subtropical or tropical high-altitude grassland, caves, arable land, and heavily degraded former forest. It is threatened by habitat loss.

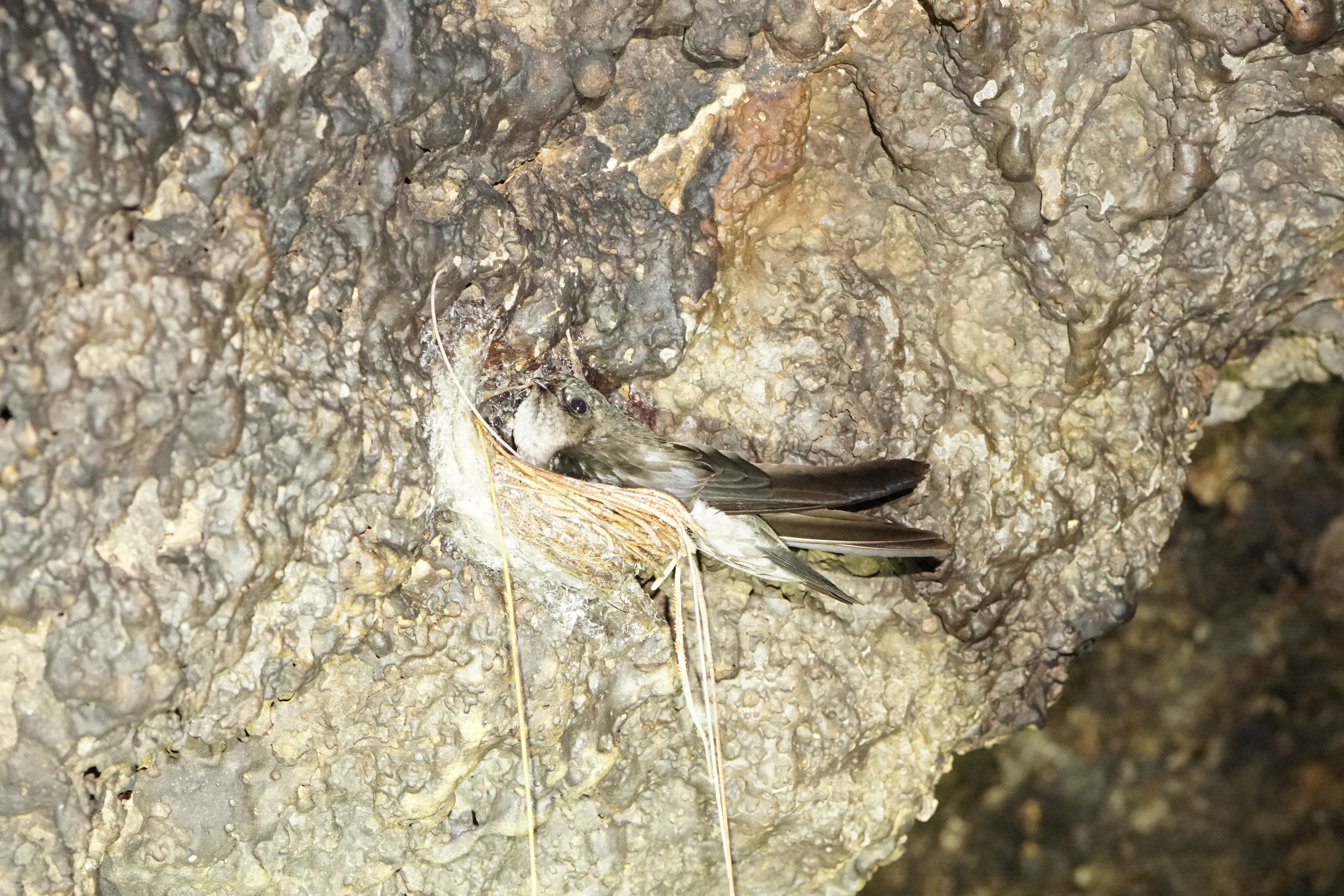
Cave-nesting Mascarene swiftlet

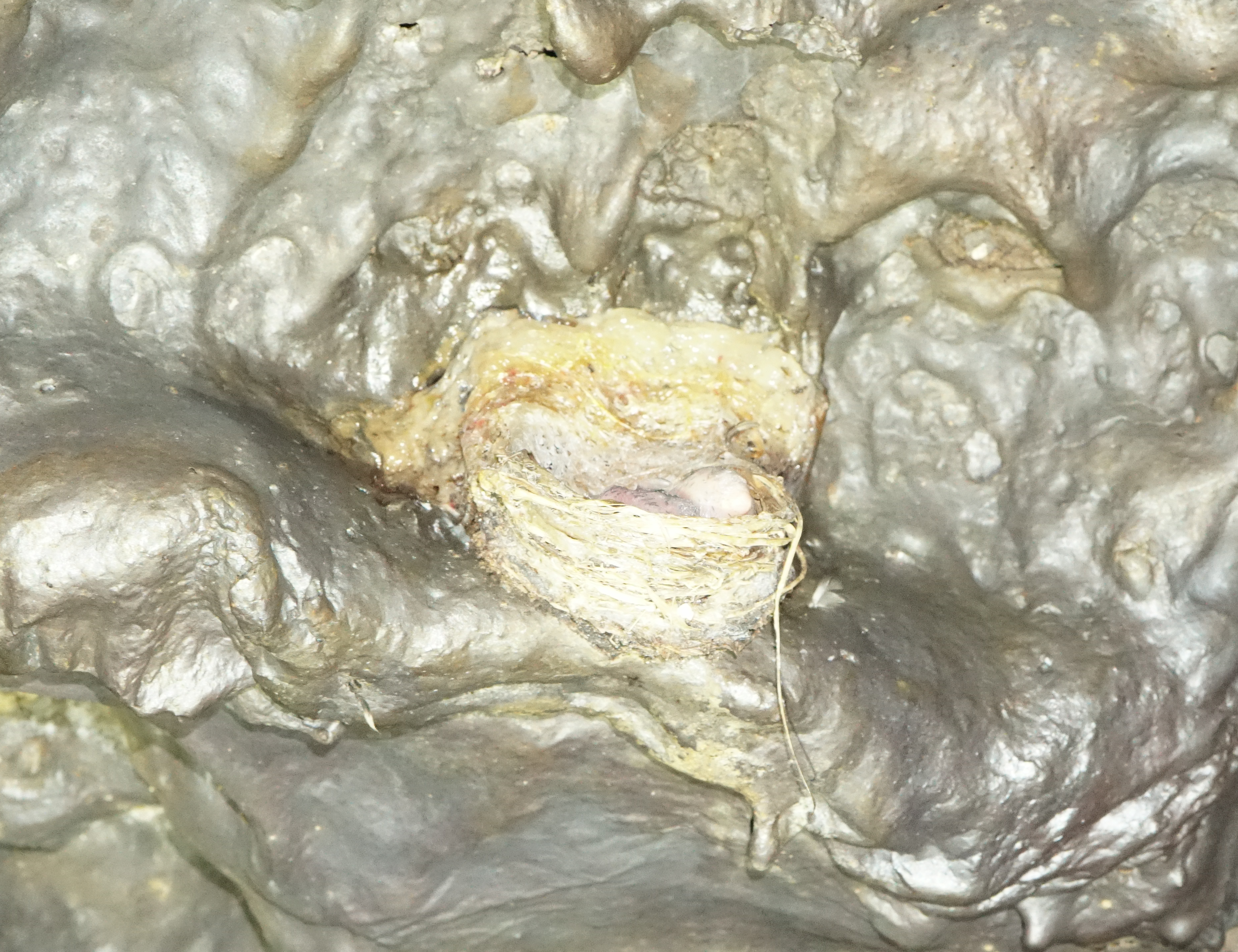
Nest of a Mascarene swiftlet on a cave roof

== Taxonomy ==
The Mascarene swiftlet was formally described in 1789 by the German naturalist Johann Friedrich Gmelin in his revised and expanded edition of Carl Linnaeus's Systema Naturae. He placed it with the swifts and swallows in the genus Hirundo, and coined the binomial name Hirundo francica. Gmelin based his description on "La petite hirondelle noire à croupion gris" that had been described in 1779 by the French polymath Georges-Louis Leclerc, Comte de Buffon from a specimen collected on the "Île de France" (Mauritius) in his Histoire Naturelle des Oiseaux. A hand-coloured illustration was also published. The Mascarene swiftlet is now placed with 27 other swiftlets in the genus Aerodramus, which was introduced in 1906 by the American ornithologist Harry C. Oberholser. The genus name combines the Ancient Greek aēr meaning "air" with -dromos meaning "-racer" (from trekhō "to run"). The specific epithet francicus signifies the "Île de France", the type locality.

Two subspecies are recognised:

- A. f. francicus (Gmelin, JF, 1789) – Mauritius
- A. f. saffordi Kirwan, Shirihai & Schweizer, 2018 – La Réunion
