= International Swift Conference =

Ornithological conference

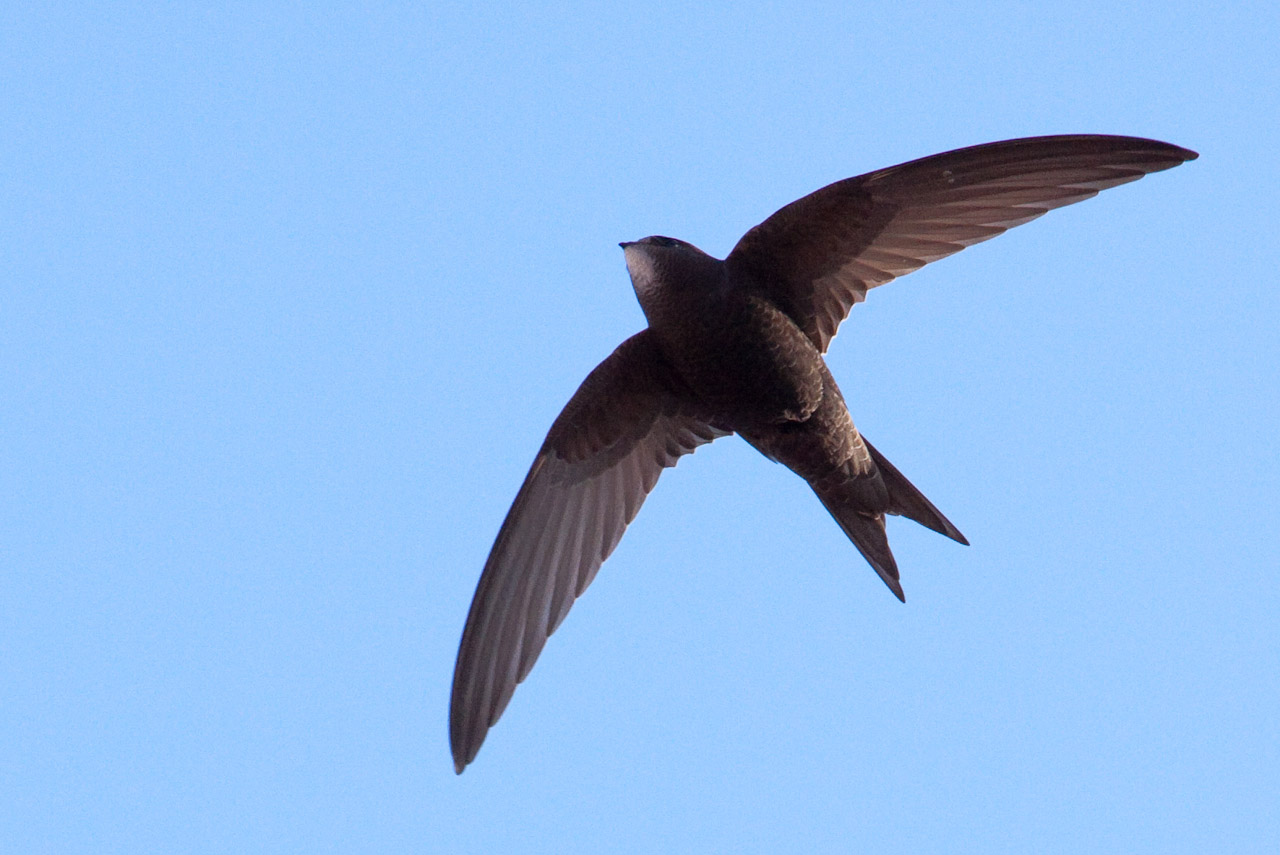
A Common Swift flying in Barcelona, Spain

International Swift Conferences are biennial meetings of ornithologists that focus on birds of the swift family. The first two conventions focused exclusively on the common swift (Apus apus), whereas the following ones broadened the scope to additional species, such as the Pallid swift (Apus pallidus) and the Alpine swift (Tachymarptis melba), presented in the Cambridge 2014 conference.

== Conferences ==
=== 2010 Berlin Common Swift Seminars ===
The first conference was held between 8 and 11 April 2010, in Berlin, Germany. 34 participants attended the conference, hosted by the Evangelical School of Neukölln. The presentations covered scientific studies of the common swift, amateur interaction with the birds, and also legal conservational aspects of protecting swifts. It was sponsored by the hosting school, and by APUSlife, the Commonswift Worldwide organization's online virtual magazine.

=== 2012 Berlin Common Swift Seminars ===
The second conference was also held in Berlin, between 10 and 12 April 2012, again, at the Evangelical School of Neukölln. It was attended by 78 participants, from 20 countries, including Belgium, China, Czech Republic, England, Germany, Guernsey, Indonesia, Israel, Italy, Netherlands, Northern Ireland, Poland, Romania, Russia, Scotland, Slovakia, Spain, Sweden, Switzerland and Turkey.

=== 2014 Cambridge International Swift Conference ===
Held between 8 and 10 April 2014 at the Parkside Community College, Cambridge. As mentioned above, this conference was the first in the series to cover species other than the common swift.

=== 2016 Szczecin International Swift Conference ===
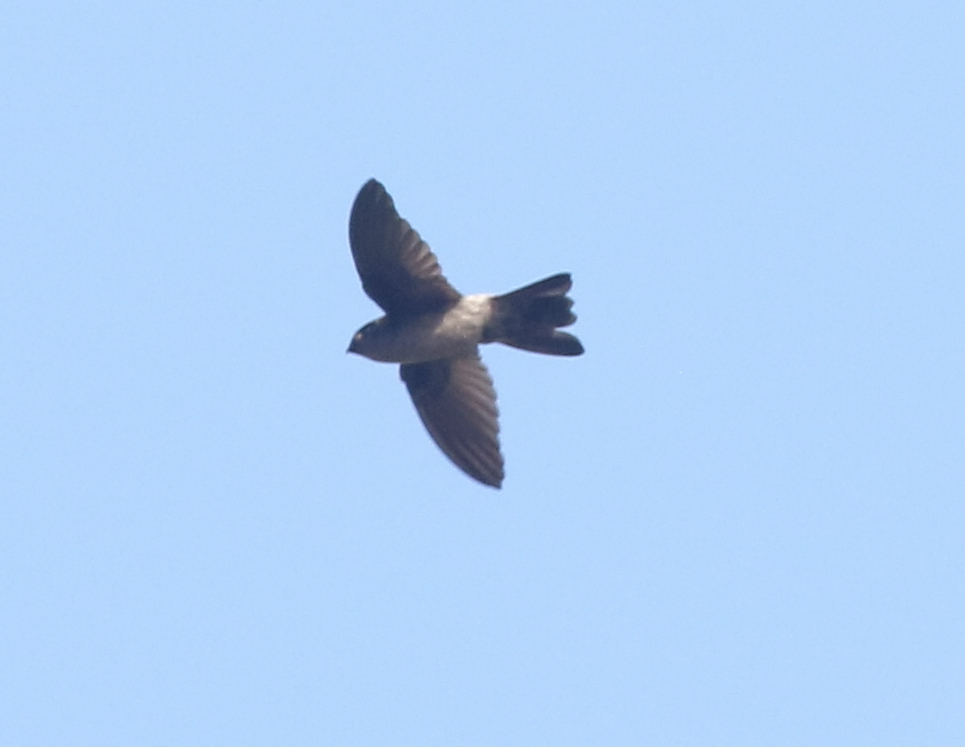
An Australian swiftlet over the Cairns Centenary Lakes

Held in between 7 and 10 April 2016, at the Hotel Nord in Szczecin, Poland, with 84 attendants from 23 countries: Australia, Belgium, Cyprus, Czech Republic, England, France, Germany, Greece, Guernsey, Ireland, Israel, Italy, Netherlands, Northern Ireland, Norway, Poland, Russia, Serbia, Spain, Sweden, Switzerland, Turkey and Uzbekistan. Among the presentations was Michael Tarburton's, about the Australian swiftlet, Aerodramus terraereginae.

=== 2018 Tel Aviv International Swift Conference ===
Held between 11 and 16 March 2018, at the Ruth Daniel Residence Hotel, in Jaffa, Israel, with 64 participants from 20 countries: Austria, Belgium, Cyprus, Czech Republic, Germany, Greece, Ireland, Israel, Italy, Jordan, Latvia, Netherlands, Poland, Romania, Spain, Switzerland, Tanzania, UK and United States.

This conference was the first outside of Europe, and it introduced two more topics, in addition to the scientific and legal ones:

- Geopolitical aspects of birding, not directly related to swifts:
  - Prof. Yossi Leshem of the Tel Aviv University and Amnonn Hahn, Director of The Friends Of The Swifts Association, presented the approach to use birds to enhance regional cooperation, exemplified by these three projects:
    - Owls for peace: how conservation science is reaching across borders in the Middle East
    - The scientific-educational project of tracking German storks fitted with satellite transmitters, on the portal www.birds.org.il.
    - The seminar "Artists for Nature – Saving the Dead Sea through art and music", A Jordanian, Palestinian and Israeli Initiative, held 16–27 March 2017, on both the Israeli and Jordanian sides of the Dead Sea.
  - Ikram Quttaineh presented the Mahmiyat.ps website, in his lecture titled "Environmental awareness, from the virtual world to the real world".
  - General Mansour Abu Rashid, Chairman of Amman Center for Peace and Development (ACPD), Jordan, spoke about Israeli-Jordanian cooperation, emphasizing "the war for peace".
- It also covered artistic points of views of swifts:
  - The photographer Lothar Schiffler's presentation on his exhibition "AIRLINES – Bird Tracks in the Air", based on the technique of Iskiography that he developed for visualization of birds' flight tracks.
  - The sculptor Mark Coreth's presentation of his sculpture Tree of Hope.

=== 2022 Segovia (Spain) International Swift Conference ===
The 6th International Swift Conference, the first one to be held in the Iberian Peninsula, was initially planned to be held in Segovia, 20–22 May 2020, but due to the COVID-19 pandemic was postponed to May 2021.

Fortunately, in January 2022, the Spanish association Forogeobiosfera retakes the organization of the conference with hope. In the end, the 6th International Swift Conference will be held on May 25-27, 2022 in Segovia (Spain) despite all the difficulties encountered along the way. Info: www.swiftsegovia2020.com
