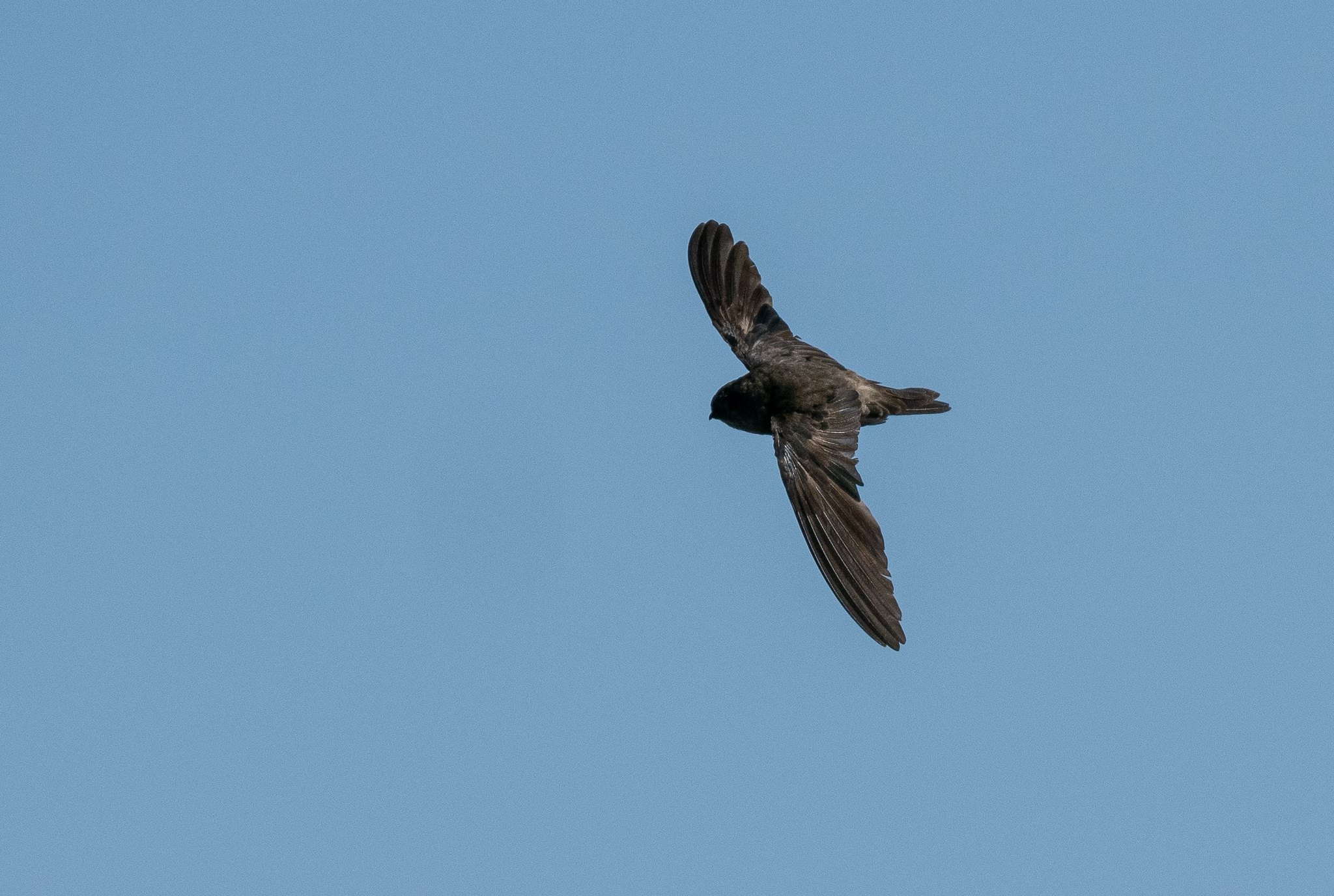

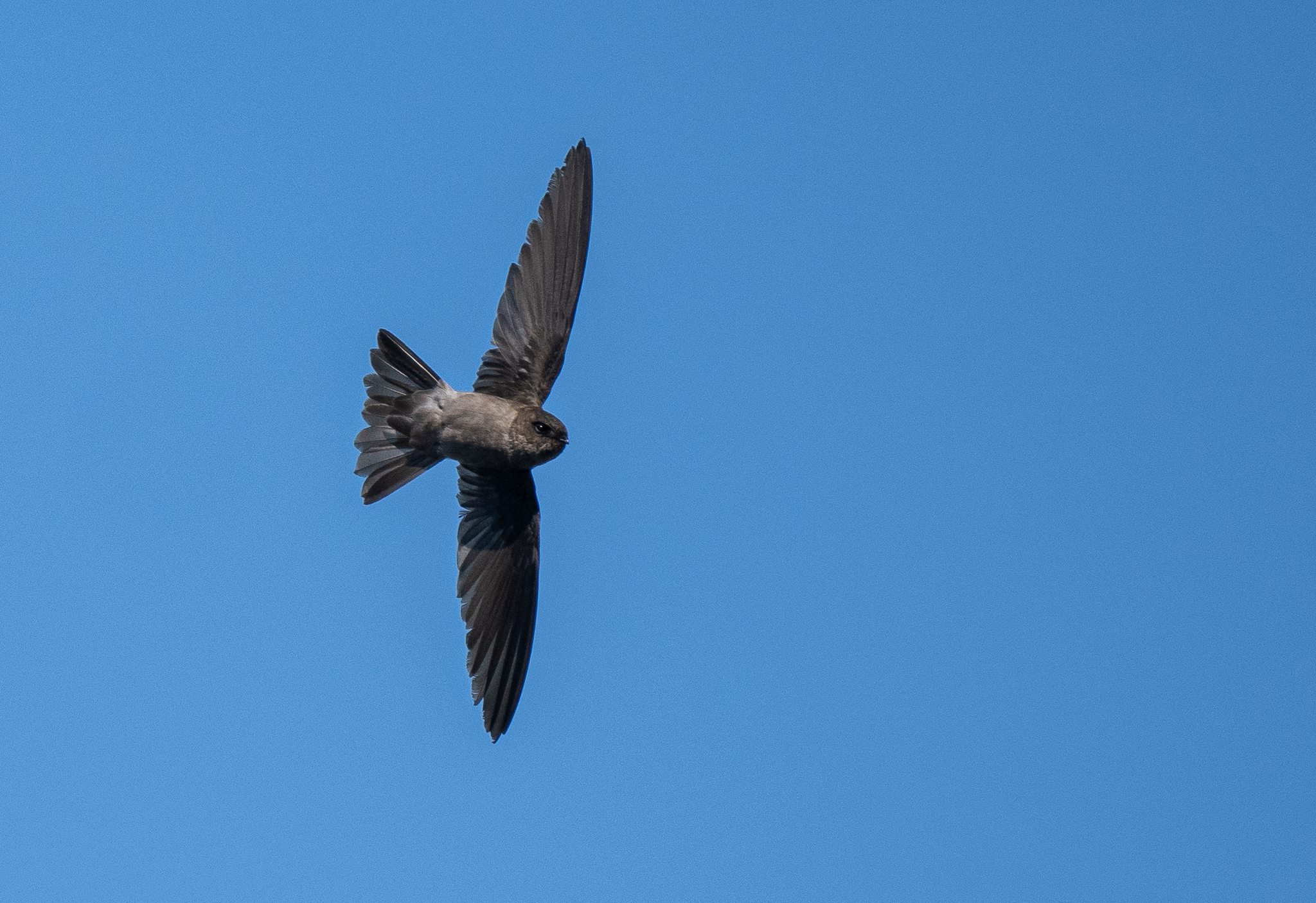

Conservation status
- Near Threatened (IUCN 3.1)

Scientific classification
- Kingdom: Animalia
- Phylum: Chordata
- Class: Aves
- Order: Apodiformes
- Family: Apodidae
- Genus: Aerodramus
- Species: A. vulcanorum

Binomial name
- Aerodramus vulcanorum (Stresemann, 1926)

= Volcano swiftlet =

Species of bird

The volcano swiftlet (Aerodramus vulcanorum or Collocalia vulcanorum) is a species of bird in the Apodidae family, formerly considered conspecific with the Himalayan swiftlet (Aerodramus brevirostris).The volcano swiftlet is commonly measured at 13–14 centimetres (5.1–5.5 in) long and characterized as dark gray with an unmissable brown rump band, whereas younger individuals show a less defined band. They can be easily heard because of the unique "Teeree teereeeee teeereeeee" clicking sound they make. Nothing is known about the diet of this bird. Many species of Aerodramus swiftlets nest colonially in caves, which leads them to use echolocation to navigate through the dark environments like caves and crevices, as well as during the twilight hours. While the swiftlet can echolocate like the very known species of the bat, they are much less educated and less refined in using it for capturing prey. This echolocation capability distinguishes Aerodramus from closely related genera like Hydrochous and most species within Collocalia.

== Description ==
The main distinguishing characteristics of the volcano swiftlet are its tail fork and black wings that appear glossed with a purple shimmer. One of the defining differences between males and females is the condition of the tarsus. The male swiftlet has a bare tarsus while the female has a feathered tarsus. Both sexes however share the distinctive feature of having white rami (the branching structures extending from the feather shaft giving the feather their texture and aiding in flight). As for the young volcano swiftlets, they have a less defined rump band and fewer feathers in the tarsus.

== Habitat ==
The volcano swiftlet lives on in the island of Java in Indonesia and in the forest of Bali. The volcano swiftlet is commonly spotted in six volcanic locations on the island of Java. These volcanoes are Mount Gede, Mount Pangrango, Tangkuban Perahu, Mount Ciremai, Mount Slamet and the Yang Highlands. The swiftlet tends to nest in rock crevices at 2200–3000 meters, although they can also be found around peaks and ridges of volcanoes over mountainous forest areas. The active elevation range of this species plays a major role in where it lives. Some swiftlets can also live in craters, but this is not common because they stay in the same places year-round and don't migrate. All known breeding sites of the volcano swiftlet are on active volcanoes, which highlights its unique adaptation to volatile conditions. This species is not strictly residential and it moves within its native range.

== Echolocation ==
Many species of Aerodramus swiftlets nest colonially in caves, which leads them to use echolocation to navigate through the dark environments like caves and crevices, as well as during the twilight hours. While the swiftlet can echolocate (like a bat) they are much less educated and less refined in using it for capturing prey. This echolocation capability distinguishes Aerodramus from closely related genera, such as Hydrochous, and most species within Collocalia.

== Population ==
It is estimated that there are typically around 25 pairs in a colony and there is around one colony per site, so there are probably around 400 volcano swiftlets in the world. Due to their airborne nature, the volcano swiftlet is highly skilled in colonizing islands. Several species exhibit widespread distribution across large areas of archipelagos.

=== Threats ===
There aren't many threats to the volcano swiftlet species other than an occasional extinction because of volcanic activity, as all of their known breeding sites are on active volcanoes. An extinction could potentially happen at any time.

== Diet ==
Little is known about the diet of the volcano swiftlet. However, like other swiftlets, it is gathered that they most likely forage in flight, catching small insects and possibly other airborne prey.
