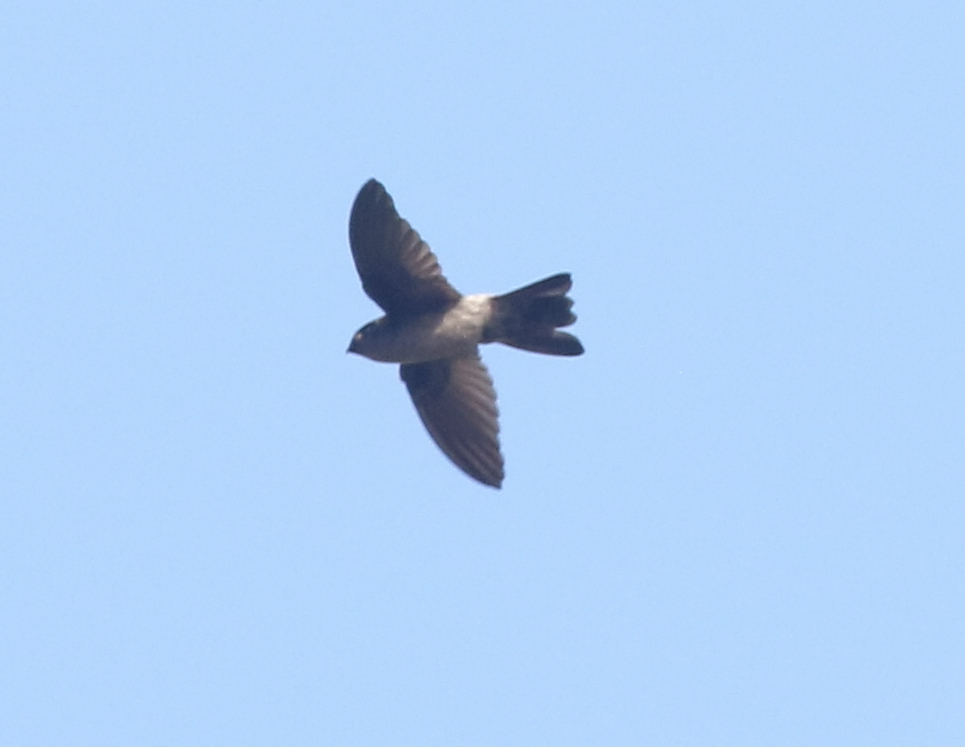
- Australian swiftlet Aerodramus terraereginae

Scientific classification
- Kingdom: Animalia
- Phylum: Chordata
- Class: Aves
- Order: Apodiformes
- Family: Apodidae
- Tribe: Collocaliini
- Genus: Aerodramus; Oberholser, 1906

Type species
- Collocalia innominata (Himalayan swiftlet) Hume, 1873

Species
- See text

= Aerodramus =

Aerodramus Temporal range: Holocene, 0 Ma Possible Miocene remains found in New Zealand.

Genus of birds

Aerodramus is a genus of small, dark, cave-nesting birds in the Collocaliini tribe of the swift family. Its members are confined to tropical and subtropical regions in southern Asia, Oceania and northeastern Australia. Many of its members were formerly classified in Collocalia, but were first placed in a separate genus by American ornithologist Harry Church Oberholser in 1906.

This is a taxonomically difficult group of very similar species. Echolocation, DNA sequencing and parasitic lice have all been used to establish relationships, but some problems, such as the placement of the Papuan swiftlet are not fully resolved. These swiftlets can pose major identification problems where several species occur.

What distinguishes Aerodramus swiftlets from other swifts, and indeed almost all other birds, is their ability to use a simple but effective form of echolocation. This enables them to navigate within the breeding and roosting caves.

The nests of Aerodramus swiftlets are constructed with saliva as a major component. In two species, saliva is the only material used, and the nests are collected for the Chinese delicacy bird's nest soup, the over-collection of which puts pressure on the swiftlet populations.

== Distribution ==
The range of these swiftlets is confined to tropical southern Asia, Oceania, northeastern Australia and the Indian Ocean, with the greatest diversity in Southeast Asia, Indonesia and Papua New Guinea. Several of the species are restricted to small islands, and their limited range can make them vulnerable, like the Seychelles, Whitehead's and Guam swiftlets. The Mangaia swiftlet is a recently extinct species known only from fossils.

== Description ==
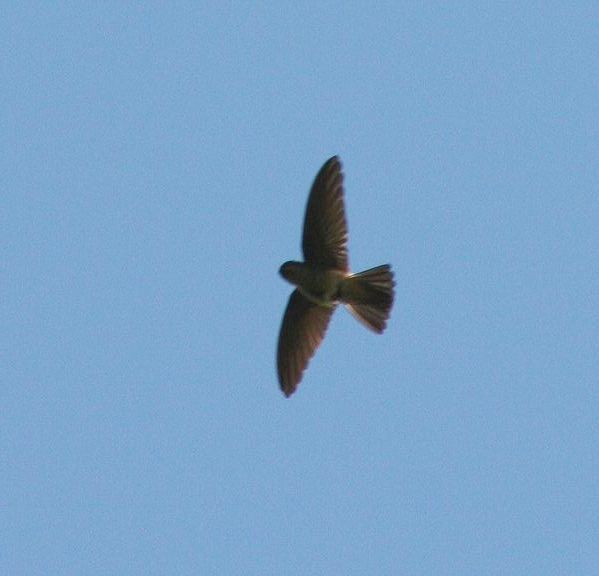
White-rumped swiftlet in flight

Aerodramus swiftlets are in many respects typical swifts, having narrow wings for fast flight, and a wide gape and small reduced beak surrounded by bristles for catching insects in flight. They have dull plumage which is mainly in shades of black, brown, and grey. Members of this genus typically have dark brown upper wings and upper body, sometimes with a paler rump, light brown underparts, a paler throat, and brownish-white under-wings with dark brown "armpits". Males and female plumages are similar in appearance, as is that of the juvenile, for those species for which it has been described; in some species the juvenile shows pale fringes to the flight feathers.

The legs, as with many swifts, are very short, preventing the birds from perching, but allowing them to cling to vertical surfaces. The flight is mainly gliding due to very long primary feathers and small breast muscles. Aerodramus swiftlets, depending on species, weigh 8–35 grammes (0.28–1.23 oz) and are 9–16 centimetres (0.28–1.23 in) long. These swiftlets are very similar, and where several species occur, such as Borneo, New Guinea and the Philippines, may not be separable in the field.

== Behaviour ==
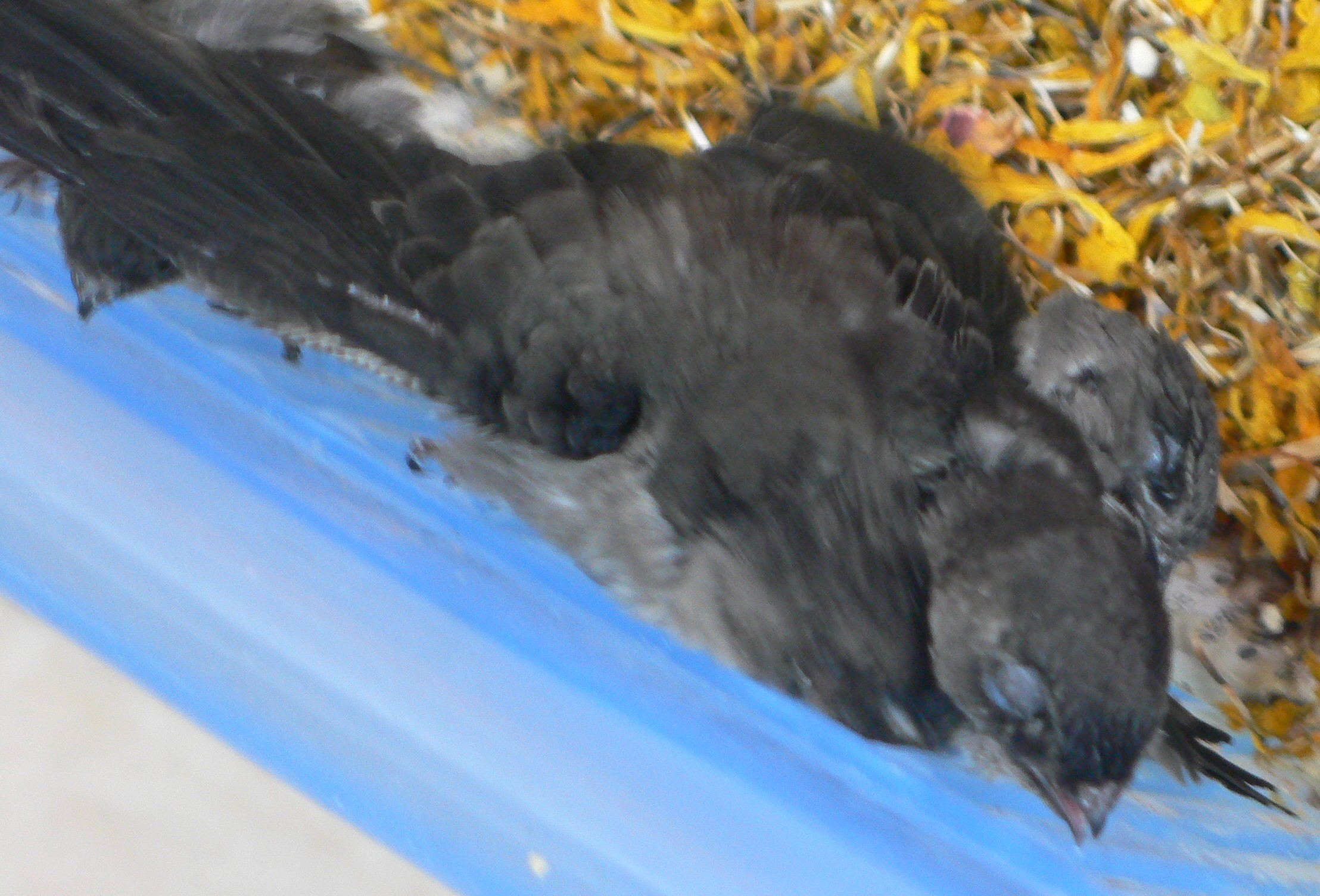
These juvenile Germain's swiftlets have fallen from nests, and are being reared by hand.

Aerodramus swiftlets are aerial insectivores, which take prey like flies on the wing. They roost and breed in caves; during the day they leave the caves to forage for food, and return to roost at night. They are monogamous and both partners take part in caring for the nestlings. Males perform aerial displays to attract females and mating occurs at the nest. The breeding season overlaps the wet season, which corresponds to an increased insect population.

Clutch size depends on the location and the food source, but generally Aerodramus swiftlets lay one or two eggs. The eggs are a dull white, and are laid every other day. Many, if not all, species are colonial nesters; some build their nests in high, dark corners on cave walls.

Most Aerodramus swiftlets live in the tropical Indo-Pacific region and do not migrate. These birds usually remain in one cave or other roosting/nesting site. Examples of cave sites include the Niah Caves and Gunung Mulu National Park, which are both located in Sarawak, Malaysian Borneo.

Characteristics of behaviour, such as what materials apart from saliva the nests contain, can be used to differentiate between certain species of Aerodramus.

== Echolocation ==
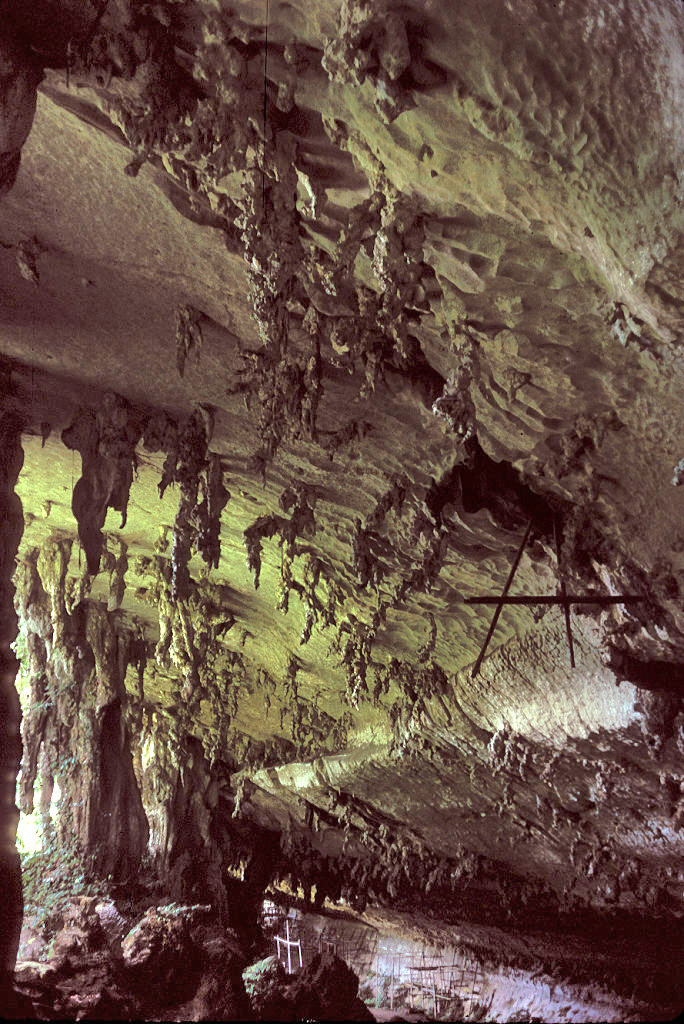
Niah cave, a swiftlet nesting site

The genus Aerodramus is of special interest due to its use of echolocation. The swiftlets use this technique to navigate in darkness through the chasms and shafts of the caves where they breed and roost at night. Apart from swiftlets, the only other avian species to use echolocation is the unrelated oilbird.

The Aerodramus swiftlets' echolocating double clicks are within the normal human hearing range and up to 3 milliseconds apart, with the interval becoming shorter in darker locations. Unlike the rest of the genus (for those species which have been studied), the Atiu swiftlet, Aerodramus sawtelli, and the black-nest swiftlet, A. maximus, emit only single clicks. The former species also uses echolocation outside its caves.

The use of echolocation was once used to separate Aerodramus from the other non-echolocating cave swiftlet genera Collocalia and Hydrochous (virtually nothing is known about Schoutedenapus). However, recently, the pygmy swiftlet, Collocalia troglodytes, was discovered making similar clicking noises both inside and outside its roosting cave.

It has recently been determined that the echolocation vocalizations do not agree with evolutionary relationship between swiftlet species as suggested by DNA sequence comparison. This suggests that as in bats, echolocation sounds, once present, adapt rapidly and independently to the particular species' acoustic environment.

A study suggested that the echolocation subunits were mainly located in the central nervous system, while the subunits in the vocal apparatus were already present and capable of use before echolocation even evolved. This study supports the hypothesis of independent evolution of echolocation in Aerodramus and Collocalia, with the subsequent evolution of complex behaviour needed to complement the physical echolocation system, or just possibly that the vocal apparatus-parts of the echolocation system might even be inherited from some prehistoric nocturnal ancestor.

It has been suggested that the giant or waterfall swiftlet, Hydrochous gigas, which cannot echolocate, may be descended from an echolocating ancestor.

== Saliva nests ==
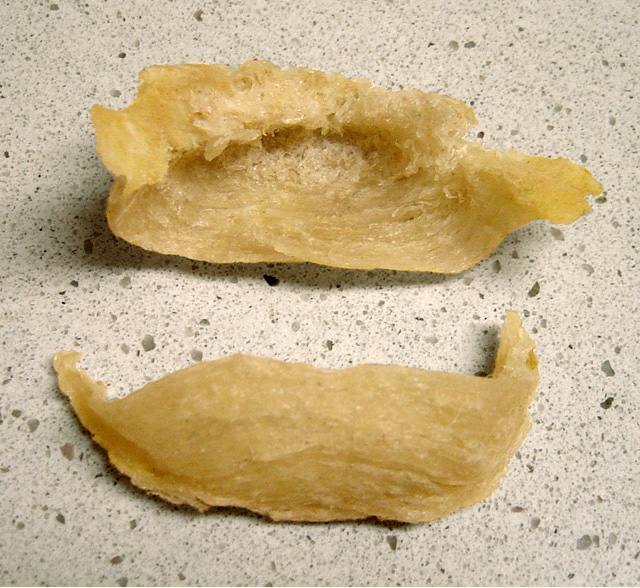
An edible nest

The intricately constructed saliva nests of this swiftlet genus, which in some species contain no other material, can be collected to make bird's nest soup.

Authentic bird's nest soup is made from the nests of the edible-nest swiftlet (or white-nest swiftlet), Aerodramus fuciphagus, and the black-nest swiftlet, Aerodramus maximus. Instead of incorporating twigs, feathers and straw like others in the genus, these two swiftlets make their nest only from strands of their gummy saliva, which harden when exposed to air. Once the nests are harvested, they are cleaned and sold to restaurants. In the late 20th century, the high demand for the nests of these Aerodramus species had an adverse effect on their populations. The Niah caves population of black-nest swiftlets plunged from around 1.5 million pairs in 1959 to 150,000–298,000 pairs in the early 1990s through over-harvesting.

Early authors had doubts about the material used to make the nest, with whale and fish sperm and sea foam being proposed as the basis for construction. Even in the 1830s, when the use of saliva had been fairly well established, it was believed that it was only a cement to bind a sea plant which provided the bulk of the gelatinous material of the nest.

== Lice ==
As with other taxonomically difficult groups, ectoparasites can give information on relationships. A study of swiftlet parasites in northern Borneo involved transferring lice between closely related swiftlet species. The survival of lice in most of these transfers was significantly reduced in proportion to the mean difference in feather barb size between the donor and recipient species of hosts. Thus, adaptation to a particular resource on the body of the host appears to govern the specificity of swiftlet lice. In transfers where lice survived, the lice moved to different areas on the body of the host where the mean barb diameter of the feathers on which the lice occurred had the required value.

== Papuan swiftlet ==
The Papuan swiftlet, Aerodramus papuensis, has three toes instead of the usual four in this group. It has the ability to echolocate, but whereas other previously studied species use echolocation primarily while flying in their caves, the Papuan swiftlet appears to be nocturnal or crepuscular and uses echolocation while active outside at night. It uses single, not double, clicks. DNA sequence data provides strong support for a basal relationship between A. papuensis and other Aerodramus taxa and suggest that this species and the waterfall swift Hydrochous gigas, are sister taxa, a relationship that would indicate paraphyly of the genus Aerodramus.

== Taxonomy ==
The genus Aerodramus was introduced (as a subgenus of Collocalia) in 1906 by the American ornithologist Harry C. Oberholser. He designated the type species as Collocalia innominata Hume. This taxon is now considered as a subspecies of the Himalayan swiftlet (Aerodramus brevirostris). The genus name combines the Ancient Greek aēr meaning "air" with -dromos meaning "-racer" (from trekhō "to run").

The genus now contains 25 species:

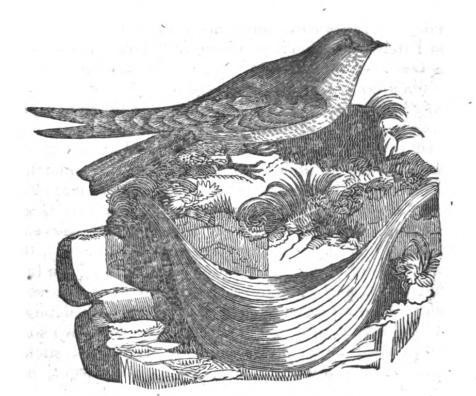
John Latham figure of the "Esculent Swallow and its Nest"

Image	Scientific name	Common name	Distribution
-	Aerodramus elaphrus	Seychelles swiftlet	Seychelles
	Aerodramus francicus	Mascarene swiftlet	Réunion and Mauritius
	Aerodramus unicolor	Indian swiftlet	southwest India and Sri Lanka
	Aerodramus mearnsi	Philippine swiftlet	Philippines
-	Aerodramus infuscatus	Moluccan swiftlet	Sulawesi and Moluccas
-	Aerodramus hirundinaceus	Mountain swiftlet	montane New Guinea
-	Aerodramus spodiopygius	White-rumped swiftlet	Melanesia
	Aerodramus terraereginae	Australian swiftlet	northeastern Queensland
	Aerodramus brevirostris	Himalayan swiftlet	Himalayas, southern Chine and Myanmar ; winters to Malay peninsula
-	Aerodramus vulcanorum	Volcano swiftlet	montane Java
-	Aerodramus whiteheadi	Whitehead's swiftlet	Philippines : mount Data (Luzon) and mount Apo (Mindanao)
-	Aerodramus nuditarsus	Bare-legged swiftlet	sparsely montane New Guinea
-	Aerodramus orientalis	Mayr's swiftlet	New Ireland and Guadalcanal
-	Aerodramus salangana	Mossy-nest swiftlet	Indonesia
	Aerodramus vanikorensis	Uniform swiftlet	eastern Indonesia and Melanesia
-	Aerodramus amelis	Ameline swiftlet	Philippines
-	Aerodramus pelewensis	Palau swiftlet	Palau
-	Aerodramus bartschi	Mariana swiftlet	Mariana Islands
-	Aerodramus inquietus	Caroline swiftlet	Caroline Islands
-	Aerodramus leucophaeus	Tahiti swiftlet	Tahiti and Moorea
	Aerodramus sawtelli	Atiu swiftlet	Atiu (Cook Islands)
-	Aerodramus ocistus	Marquesan swiftlet	Marquesas Islands
	Aerodramus maximus	Black-nest swiftlet	Southeast Asia
	Aerodramus fuciphagus	Edible-nest swiftlet	Southeast Asia
-	Aerodramus papuensis	Three-toed swiftlet	sparsely montane New-Guinea

== Fossil species ==
The Mangaia swiftlet (Aerodramus manuoi) is a prehistoric species known from fossils.

A right ulna (MNZ S42799) found at the Bannockburn Formation of the Manuherikia Group near the Manuherikia River in Otago, New Zealand. Dating from the Early to Middle Miocene (Altonian, 19-16 million years ago), probably belongs to Aerodramus.
