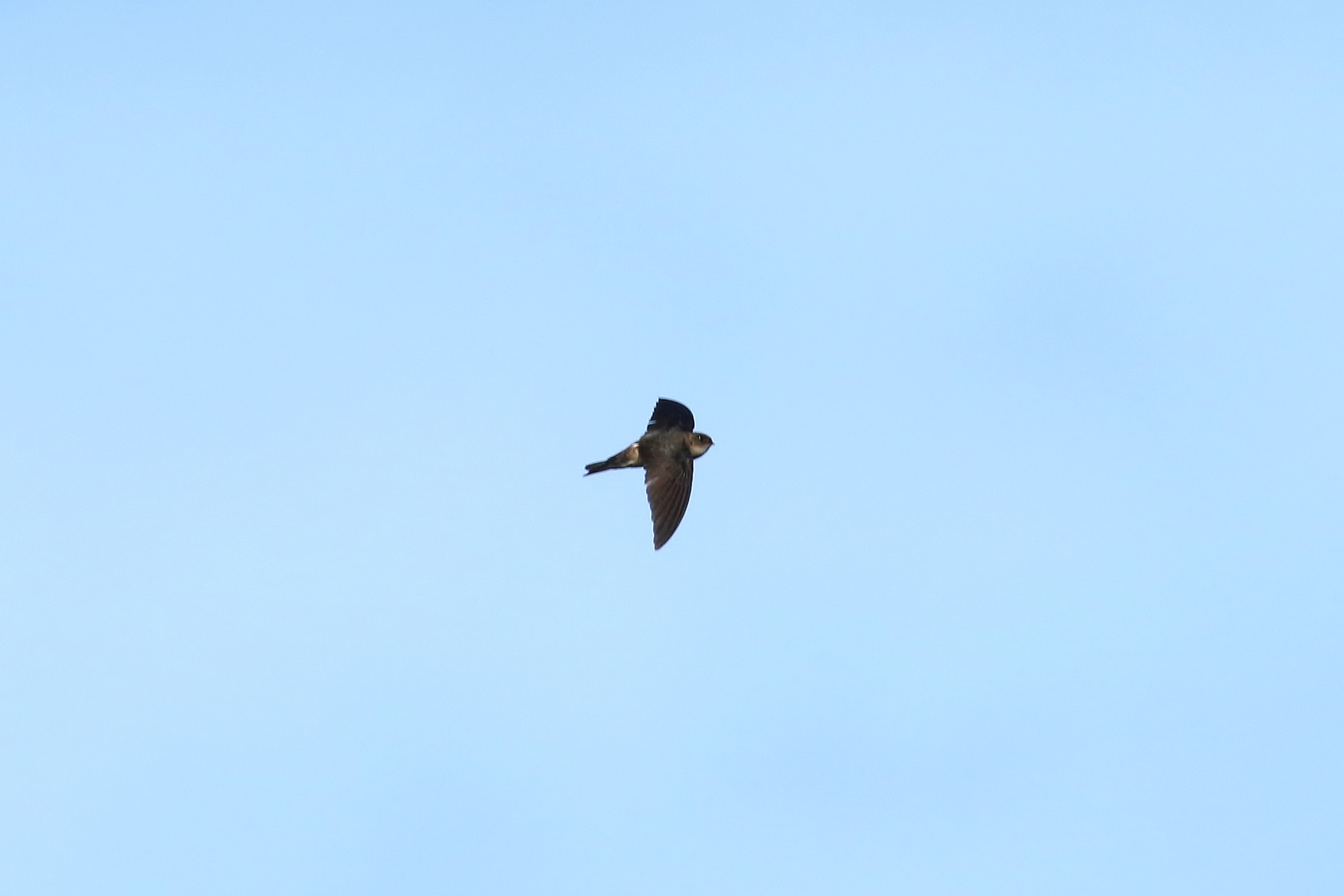

Conservation status
- Least Concern (IUCN 3.1)

Scientific classification
- Kingdom: Animalia
- Phylum: Chordata
- Class: Aves
- Order: Apodiformes
- Family: Apodidae
- Genus: Aerodramus
- Species: A. pelewensis

Binomial name
- Aerodramus pelewensis (Mayr, 1935)

Synonyms
- Collocalia pelewensis

= Palau swiftlet =

Species of bird

The Palau swiftlet (Aerodramus pelewensis) is a species of swift in the family Apodidae. It is endemic to Palau.

Its natural habitat is subtropical or tropical moist lowland forests.

== Sources ==
- BirdLife International 2004. Aerodramus pelewensis. 2006 IUCN Red List of Threatened Species. Downloaded on 24 July 2007.
