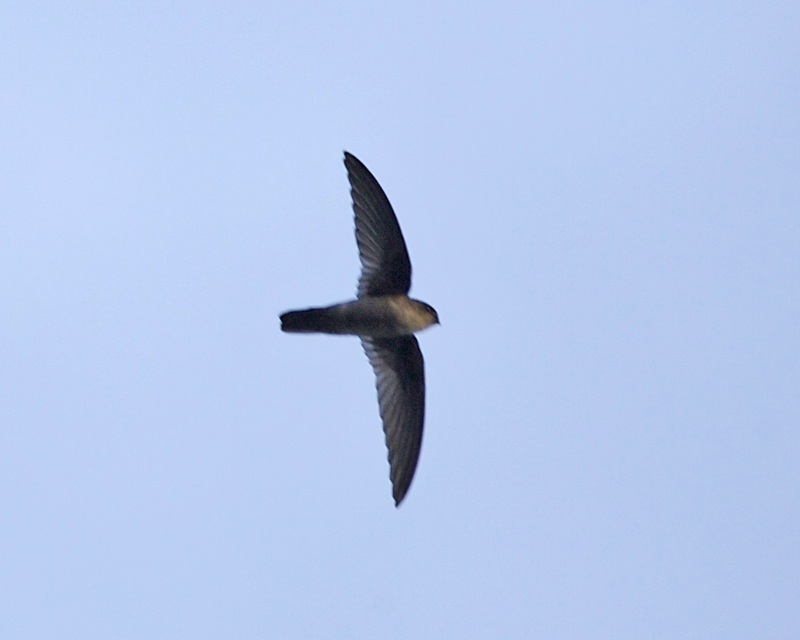

Conservation status
- Least Concern (IUCN 3.1)

Scientific classification
- Kingdom: Animalia
- Phylum: Chordata
- Class: Aves
- Clade: Strisores
- Order: Apodiformes
- Family: Apodidae
- Genus: Aerodramus
- Species: A. vanikorensis

Binomial name
- Aerodramus vanikorensis (Quoy & Gaimard, 1832)

Synonyms
- Aerodramus bartschi; Collocalia amelis Oberholser, 1906; Collocalia palawanensis Stresemann, 1914; Collocalia vanikorensis

= Uniform swiftlet =

Species of bird

The uniform swiftlet (Aerodramus vanikorensis), also known as the Vanikoro swiftlet or lowland swiftlet, is a gregarious, medium-sized swiftlet with a shallowly forked tail. The colouring is dark grey-brown, darker on the upperparts with somewhat paler underparts, especially on chin and throat. This species is widespread from the Philippines through Wallacea, New Guinea and Melanesia. It forages for flying insects primarily in lowland forests and open areas. It nests in caves where it uses its sense of echolocation, rare in birds, to navigate.

== Taxonomy ==
The uniform swift was formally described in 1832 by the French naturalists Jean Quoy and Joseph Gaimard from a specimen collected on the island of Vanikoro in the Solomon Islands. They coined the binomial name Hirundo vanikorensis. This swiftlet is now placed in the genus Aerodramus that was introduced in 1906 by Harry C. Oberholser.

Twelve subspecies are recognised:

- A. v. aenigma (Riley, 1918) – north, central, southeast Sulawesi, Banggai Islands and Sula Islands is. (east of Sulawesi)
- A. v. heinrichi (Stresemann, 1932) – south Sulawesi
- A. v. moluccarum (Stresemann, 1914) – central, south Moluccas
- A. v. waigeuensis (Stresemann & Paludan, 1932) – north Moluccas and Raja Ampat Islands (northwest of New Guinea)
- A. v. steini (Stresemann & Paludan, 1932) – Numfor and Biak (Geelvink Bay islands, northwest New Guinea)
- A. v. yorki (Mathews, 1916) – Aru Islands (southwest of New Guinea), Yapen (Geelvink Bay islands, northwest New Guinea) and New Guinea
- A. v. tagulae (Mayr, 1937) – D'Entrecasteaux Archipelago, Louisiade Archipelago, Trobriand Islands and Woodlark Island (east of southeast New Guinea)
- A. v. coultasi (Mayr, 1937) – Admiralty Islands and St Matthias Islands (northwest, central north Bismarck Archipelago)
- A. v. pallens (Salomonsen, 1983) – New Hanover Island (=New Hanover), New Ireland and Dyaul (=Djaul) and New Britain (east Bismarck Archipelago)
- A. v. lihirensis (Mayr, 1937) – islands northeast of New Ireland (northeast Bismarck Archipelago)
- A. v. lugubris (Salomonsen, 1983) – Buka to Rennell Island and Makira (Solomon Islands except Tetepare)
- A. v. vanikorensis (Quoy & Gaimard, 1832) – Temotu (=Santa Cruz Islands, southeast Solomon Islands) and Vanuatu

== Description ==
The uniform swiftlet is a gregarious, medium-sized swiftlet with a shallowly forked tail. It is about 13 cm long with a wingspan averaging around 27 cm. It weighs about 11 grams. The colouring is dark grey-brown, darker on the upperparts with paler underparts, especially on chin and throat. It is similar to, and most likely to be confused with, the white-rumped swiftlet or mountain swiftlet.

== Distribution and habitat ==
This species is widespread from the Philippines through Wallacea, New Guinea and Melanesia. It has been recorded as a rare vagrant to Australia, from Cape York Peninsula and islands in Torres Strait.

The uniform swiftlet forages over lowland forests and open areas. It roosts in caves and sinkholes, mostly in limestone areas. The caves may be as little as 10 m (33 ft) long but are usually much larger. Sometimes man-made tunnels or structures are used.

== Behaviour ==
=== Food and feeding ===
This species feeds on flying insects, especially ants.

=== Breeding ===
This species nests colonially in caves where it uses echolocation to navigate. The nest is a shallow cup of mossy material and saliva, usually attached to a vertical surface of a cave wall in the completely dark zone. On Guam, Neckeropsis lepiniana, is used as the nesting material and in Hawaii, a liverwort (Herberta spp.) is used. One or two white eggs form the clutch. The incubation period is at least twelve days and the young may take thirty-five days to fledge.

== Status ==
The uniform swiftlet has a very large range and that they are locally common and in some places abundant within that range. The population has not been quantified but is believed to be stable. The birds face no particular threats, and as a result, the IUCN has listed it as being of "Least Concern".
