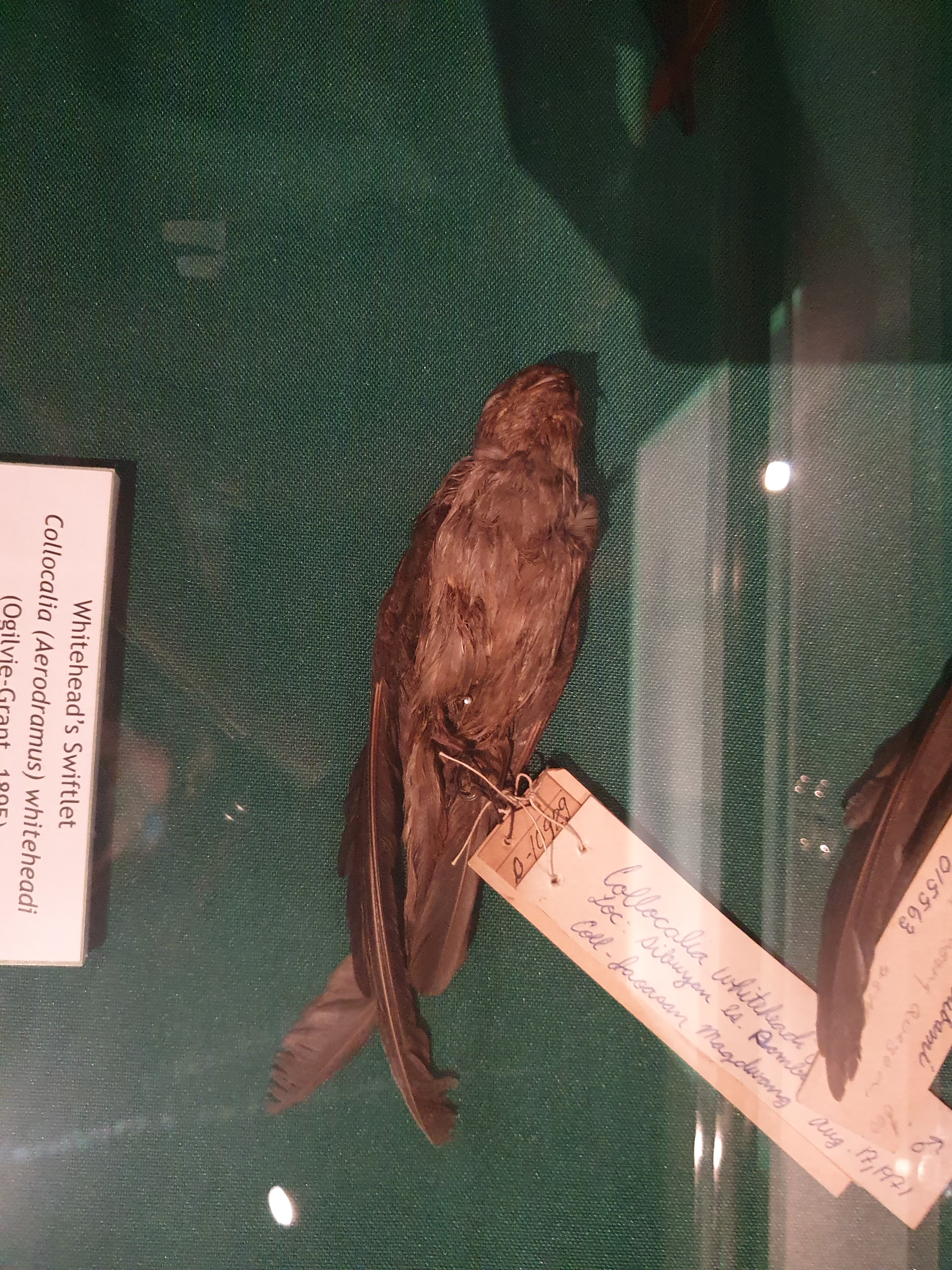

Conservation status
- Data Deficient (IUCN 3.1)

Scientific classification
- Kingdom: Animalia
- Phylum: Chordata
- Class: Aves
- Order: Apodiformes
- Family: Apodidae
- Genus: Aerodramus
- Species: A. whiteheadi

Binomial name
- Aerodramus whiteheadi (Ogilvie-Grant, 1895)

Synonyms
- Collocalia whiteheadi

= Whitehead's swiftlet =

Species of bird

Whitehead's swiftlet (Aerodramus whiteheadi) is a species of swift in the family Apodidae. It is endemic to the Philippines. It is named after the British explorer John Whitehead (1860–1899). Its natural habitat is subtropical or tropical moist montane forests. Its status is insufficiently known.

== Description and taxonomy ==
=== Subspecies ===
Two subspecies are recognized:

- A. w whiteheadi – Found on Luzon, only records on Mt. Data
- A. w. origenis – Found on Mindanao

== Ecology and behavior ==
Diet is unknown but it is pressumed to have the typical diet of insects caught in flight. Nothing is known about its breeding behaviour except nests were collected on Mt. Apo from a hollow tree in July.

== Habitat and conservation status ==
Its natural habitats are tropical montane forest beginning at 1,000 meters above sea level.

It is listed as data deficient by the International Union for Conservation of Nature with the population believed to be decreasing. Its difficulty to identify reliably, lack of records and inaccessibility of its montane habitat make it difficult to determine this species status. However, its habitat is threatened by deforestation from illegal logging, land conversion and mining.
