= Indian swiftlet =

Conservation status
- Least Concern (IUCN 3.1)

Scientific classification
- Kingdom: Animalia
- Phylum: Chordata
- Class: Aves
- Order: Apodiformes
- Family: Apodidae
- Genus: Aerodramus
- Species: A. unicolor

Binomial name
- Aerodramus unicolor (Jerdon, 1840)

Synonyms
- Collocalia unicolor (Jerdon, 1840); Hirundo unicolor Jerdon, 1840

Species of bird

The Indian Swiftlet or Indian Edible-Nest Swiftlet (Aerodramus unicolor) is a small swift. It is a common resident colonial breeder in the hills of Sri Lanka and southwest India.

The half-cup nest is built on a vertical surface, often in a cave. The male swift uses thick saliva to construct the white, shiny nest into which two eggs are laid.

The relatively tasteless nests are harvested, and mixed with chicken, spices, and other flavours as bird's nest soup, a supposed aphrodisiac.

This 12 cm long species is mainly dark brown above and paler brown below. It has swept-back wings that resemble a crescent or a boomerang. The body is slender, and the tail is short and only slightly indented.

Both sexes and young birds are similar. The Indian swiftlet has very short legs which it uses only for clinging to vertical surfaces, since swifts never settle voluntarily on the ground.

These swifts spend most of their lives in the air, living on the insects they catch in their bills, and they drink on the wing.

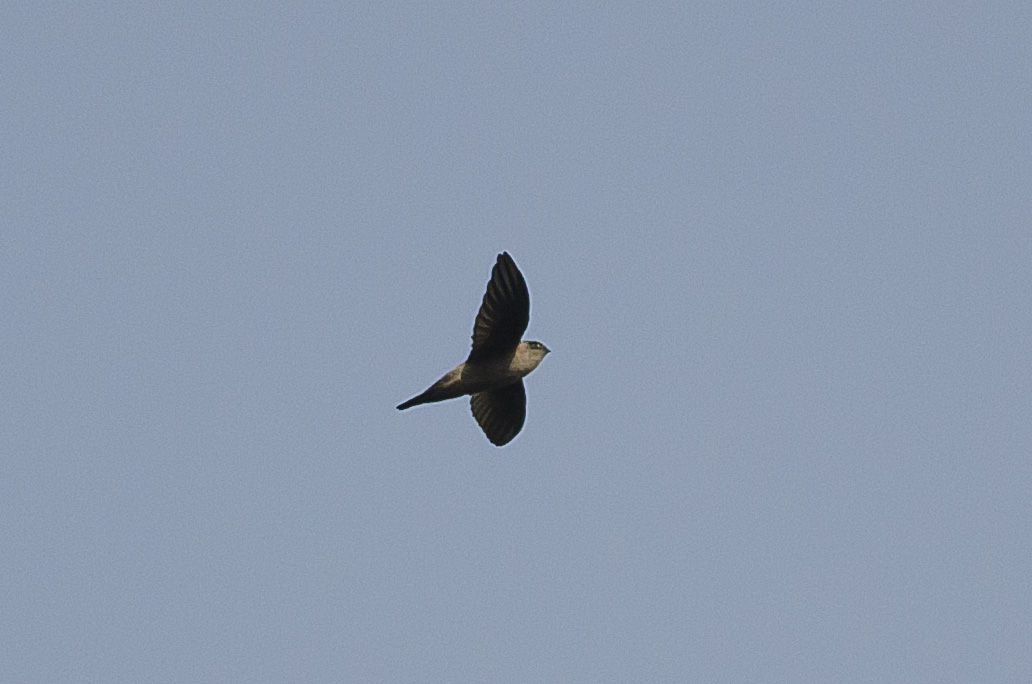
Indian Swiftlet in Thattekad, Kerala, India
