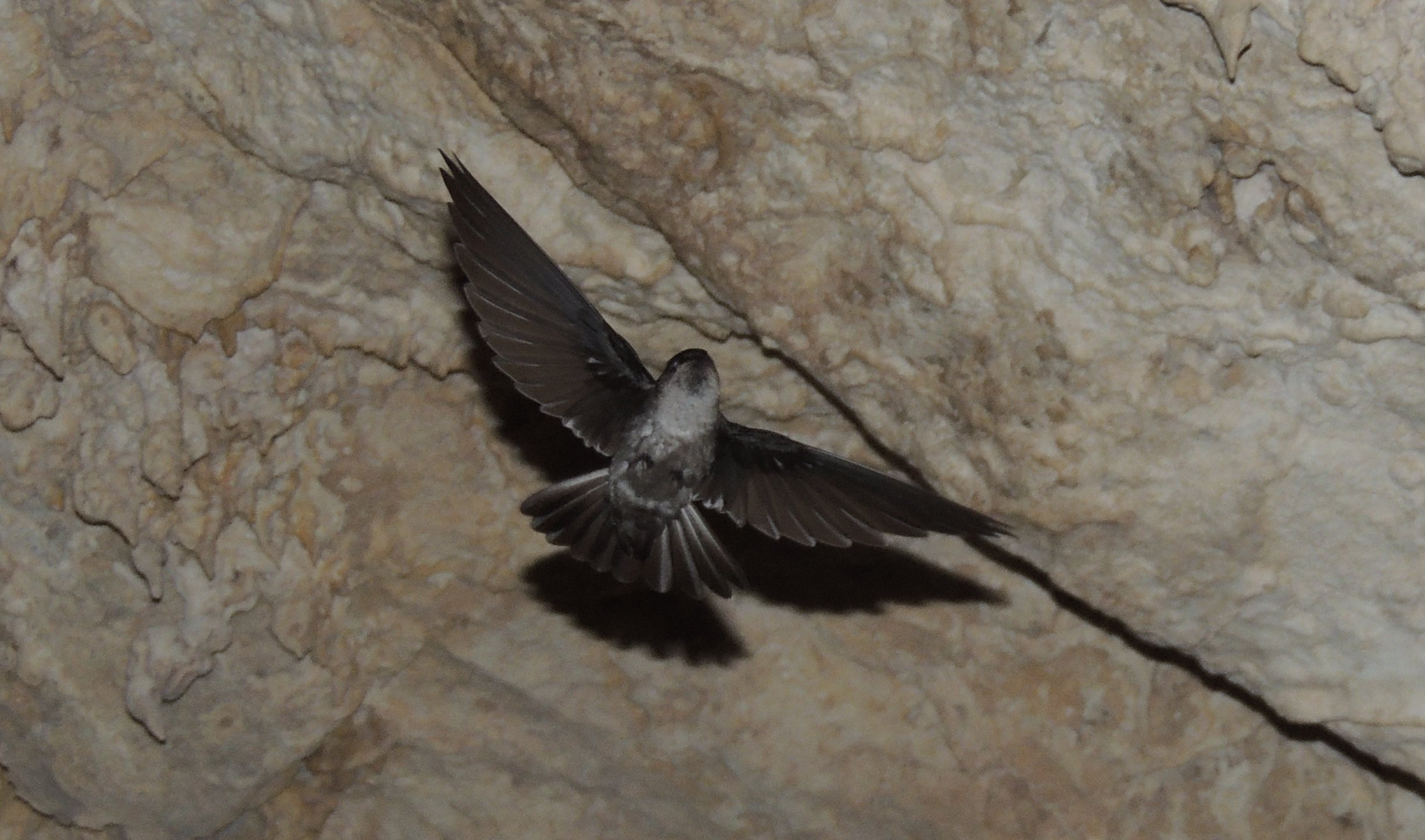

Conservation status
- Vulnerable (IUCN 3.1)

Scientific classification
- Kingdom: Animalia
- Phylum: Chordata
- Class: Aves
- Order: Apodiformes
- Family: Apodidae
- Genus: Aerodramus
- Species: A. sawtelli

Binomial name
- Aerodramus sawtelli (Holyoak, 1974)

SynonymsAvibase/>
- Collocalia sawtelli Holyoak, 1974

= Atiu swiftlet =

Species of bird

The Atiu swiftlet (Aerodramus sawtelli), or Sawtell's swiftlet, is a species of bird belonging to the family Apodidae, the swifts and swiftlets. This swiftlet is endemic to Atiu in the Cook Islands.

== Taxonomy ==
The Atiu swfitelt was firs formally described as Collocalia sawtelli in 1974 by the British ornithologist, malaclogist and bryologist David T. Holyoak with its type locality given as Annataketake Cave on Atiu in the Cook Islands. The Atiu swiftlet is now placed with 27 other swiftlets in the genus Aerodramus, which was introduced in 1906 by the American ornithologist Harry C. Oberholser. The genus Aerordramus is classified in the tribe Collocaliini of the subfamily Apodinae in the family Apodidae, which includes the swifts, swiftlets and needletails.

== Etymology ==
The Atiu swiftlet is classified in the genus Aerodramus, this name name combines the Ancient Greek aēr meaning "air" with -dromos meaning "-racer" (from trekhō "to run"). The specific name, sawtelli, honours Gordon H. Sawtell who was the secretary of the Premier's Department ofthe Government of the Cook Islands and told Holyoak of this birs existence and helped him get to Atiu and to Annataketake Cave..

== Description ==
The Atiu swiftlet is a small, mainly brown swiftlet with a ghrey throat which contrasts with its dark brownish belly. The holotype had a wingspan of 120 mm (4.7 in).

== Distribution and habitat ==
The Atiu swiftlet is only known to nest in two caves on the island of Atiu, Anatakitaki Cave in the eastern part of the island and Vaitupurangi Cave in its south. Islanders said that other smaller colonies do exist elsewhere on Atiu. It may also have occurred on Mitiar and swiftlet bones have been found on Mangaia. These bird breed colonially in caves in the fossilised coral limestone which is called makatea locally and hunt over forests, fernlands, agriculturally developed areas such as croplands, and mixed horticultural areas, avoiding feeding over the makatea.

== Biology ==
The Atiu swiftlet nests colonially in caves, the nest is constructed from plant material and the bird's saliva. It feeds on aerial insects and is known to eat Hymenoptera, Lepidoptera and Blattodea. Unlike all other swiftlets, it echolocates only through single clicks, rather than a mix of single- and double clicks.
