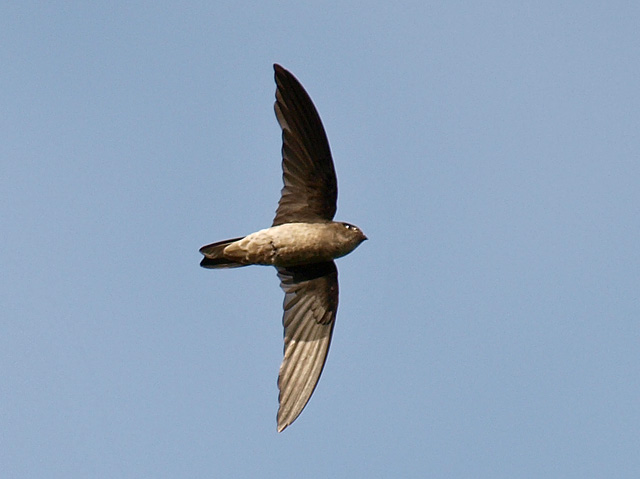
- at Upper Peirce Reservoir, Singapore

Conservation status
- Least Concern (IUCN 3.1)

Scientific classification
- Kingdom: Animalia
- Phylum: Chordata
- Class: Aves
- Order: Apodiformes
- Family: Apodidae
- Genus: Aerodramus
- Species: A. maximus

Binomial name
- Aerodramus maximus (Hume, 1878)

Synonyms
- Collocalia maxima

= Black-nest swiftlet =

Species of bird

The black-nest swiftlet (Aerodramus maximus) is a species of swift in the family Apodidae. It is found in Brunei, Indonesia, Malaysia, Myanmar, the Philippines, Singapore, Thailand, and Vietnam. Its natural habitats are subtropical or tropical moist lowland forest and subtropical or tropical moist montane forest.

Its saliva is one of the main sources of edible nests for bird's nest soup.
