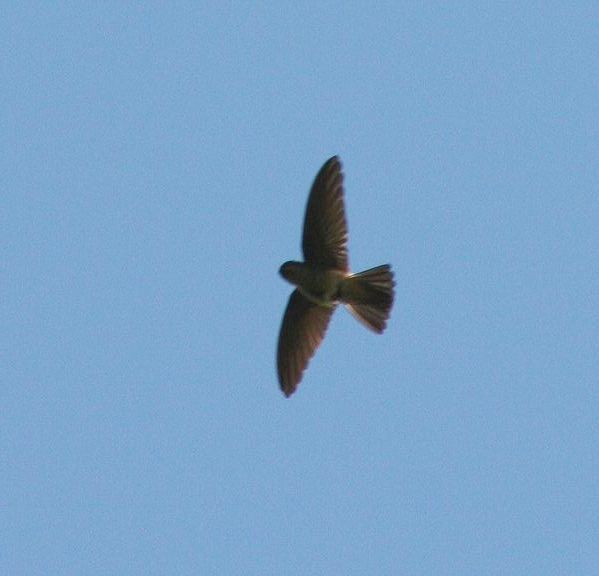

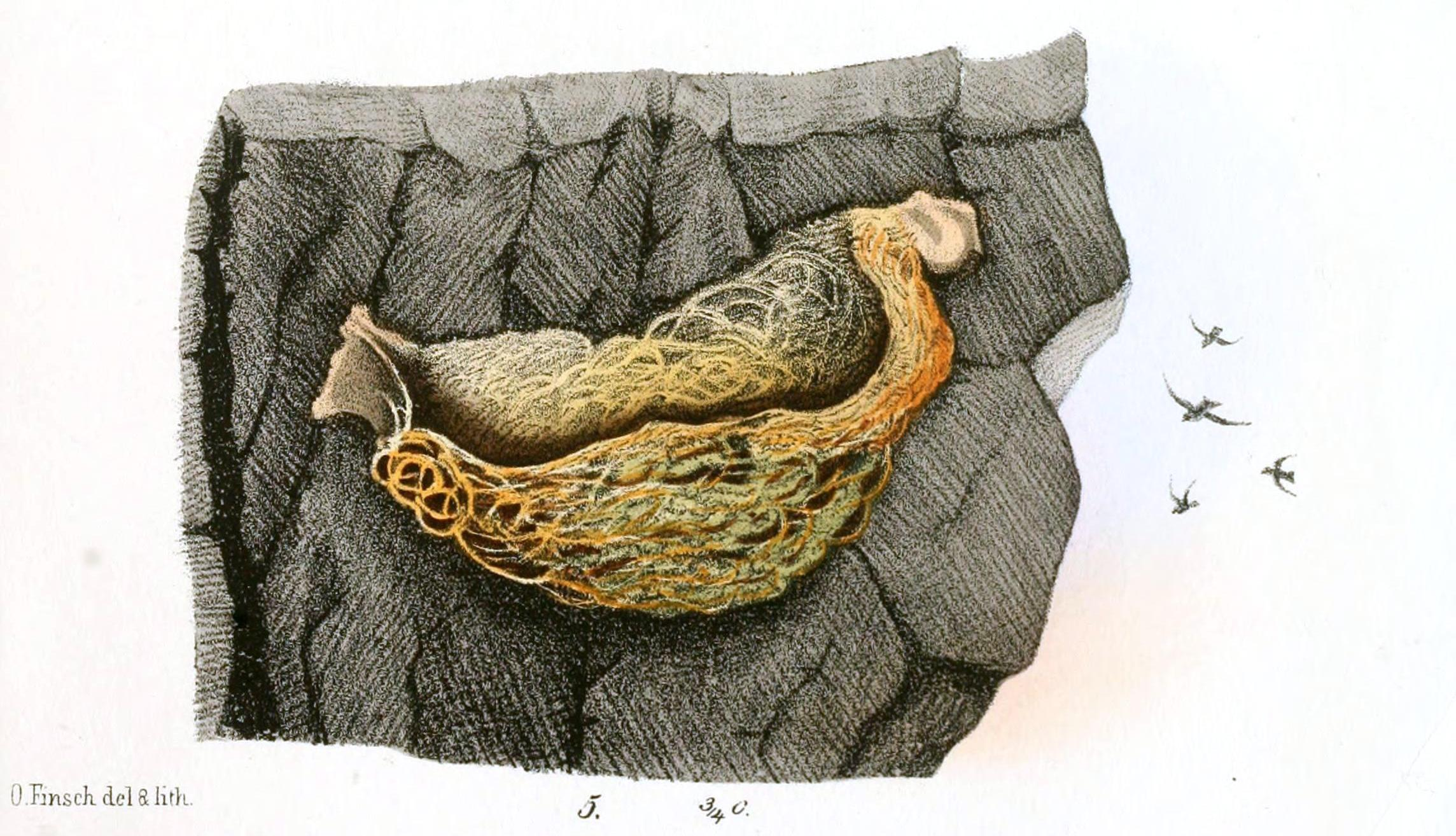

Conservation status
- Least Concern (IUCN 3.1)

Scientific classification
- Kingdom: Animalia
- Phylum: Chordata
- Class: Aves
- Clade: Strisores
- Order: Apodiformes
- Family: Apodidae
- Genus: Aerodramus
- Species: A. spodiopygius

Binomial name
- Aerodramus spodiopygius (Peale, 1849)

Synonyms
- Collocalia spodiopygia (Peale, 1848); Collocalia spodiopygius (Peale, 1848) [orthographic error]

= White-rumped swiftlet =

Species of bird

The white-rumped swiftlet (Aerodramus spodiopygius) is a species of swift in the family Apodidae.

It is found in American Samoa, Fiji, New Caledonia, Papua New Guinea, Samoa, the Solomon Islands, Tonga, and Vanuatu. Birds in Australia are now treated as a separate species, the Australian swiftlet (Aerodramus terraereginae).

Its natural habitats are subtropical or tropical moist lowland forests, subtropical or tropical moist montane forests, and rocky areas.
