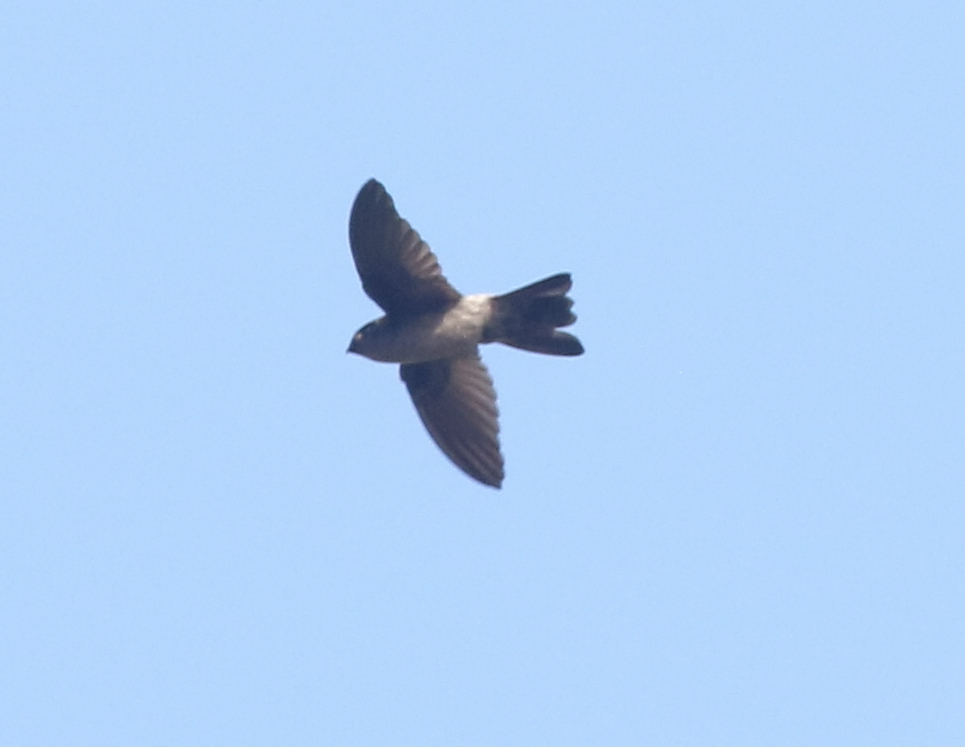

Conservation status
- Least Concern (IUCN 3.1)

Scientific classification
- Kingdom: Animalia
- Phylum: Chordata
- Class: Aves
- Clade: Strisores
- Order: Apodiformes
- Family: Apodidae
- Genus: Aerodramus
- Species: A. terraereginae

Binomial name
- Aerodramus terraereginae (Ramsay, 1875)

Synonyms
- Collocalia terraereginae

= Australian swiftlet =

Species of bird

The Australian swiftlet (Aerodramus terraereginae) is a small bird belonging to the genus Aerodramus in the swift family, Apodidae. It is endemic to Queensland in north-eastern Australia. It was formerly included in the white-rumped swiftlet (Aerodramus spodiopygius) but is now commonly treated as a separate species. It has two subspecies which are occasionally regarded as two separate species: A. t. terraereginae and A. t. chillagoensis (Chillagoe swiftlet).

== Description ==
It is 11–12 centimetres (4.3–4.7 in) long with a wing length of 107–118.2 millimetres (4.21–4.65 in) and a weight of 10.5–12.5 grams (0.37–0.44 oz). The upperparts are dark grey-brown while the underparts are a uniform greyish. There are pale feathers on the forehead and lores. The rump is normally pale greyish but can occasionally be darker. The tail is slightly forked. The form chillagoensis is smaller and paler with a weight of around 9.39 grams (0.33 oz).

It has a high-pitched flight call. In its breeding caves, it utters a metallic clicking call, used for echolocation.

== Distribution ==
A. t. terraereginae occurs in tropical north-east Queensland from the Claudie River on the Cape York Peninsula south as far as the Eungella Range near Mackay. It is mainly found near the coast including a number of offshore islands. It occurs up to 1,000 metres (3,300 ft) above sea-level but is commonest below 500 metres (1,600 ft). A. t. chillagoensis is found further inland in the area around Chillagoe, west of the Great Dividing Range.

== Ecology ==
Breeding occurs from July to March. The species breeds in colonies which can contain hundreds of individuals. These are located in caves or sometimes amongst boulders. The nest is attached to the walls or ceiling of the cave, 2–20 metres (6 ft 7 in – 65 ft 7 in) above the ground. It is translucent and basket-shaped and made from saliva mixed with grasses, casuarina needles, twigs and feathers. Two clutches are laid during the breeding season, each consisting of a single white egg. The egg is incubated by both parents for about 26.5 days. Incubation of the second egg is aided by warmth from the first chick. The young bird remains in the nest for about 46–51 days after hatching.

The Australian swiftlet feeds in flight, preying on insects and drifting spiders. It forages in flocks over rainforest edges, savanna, pastures, beaches and gorges. It generally feeds within 30 kilometres (19 mi) of the breeding colony, leaving the nest for periods of about 30 minutes to hunt.
