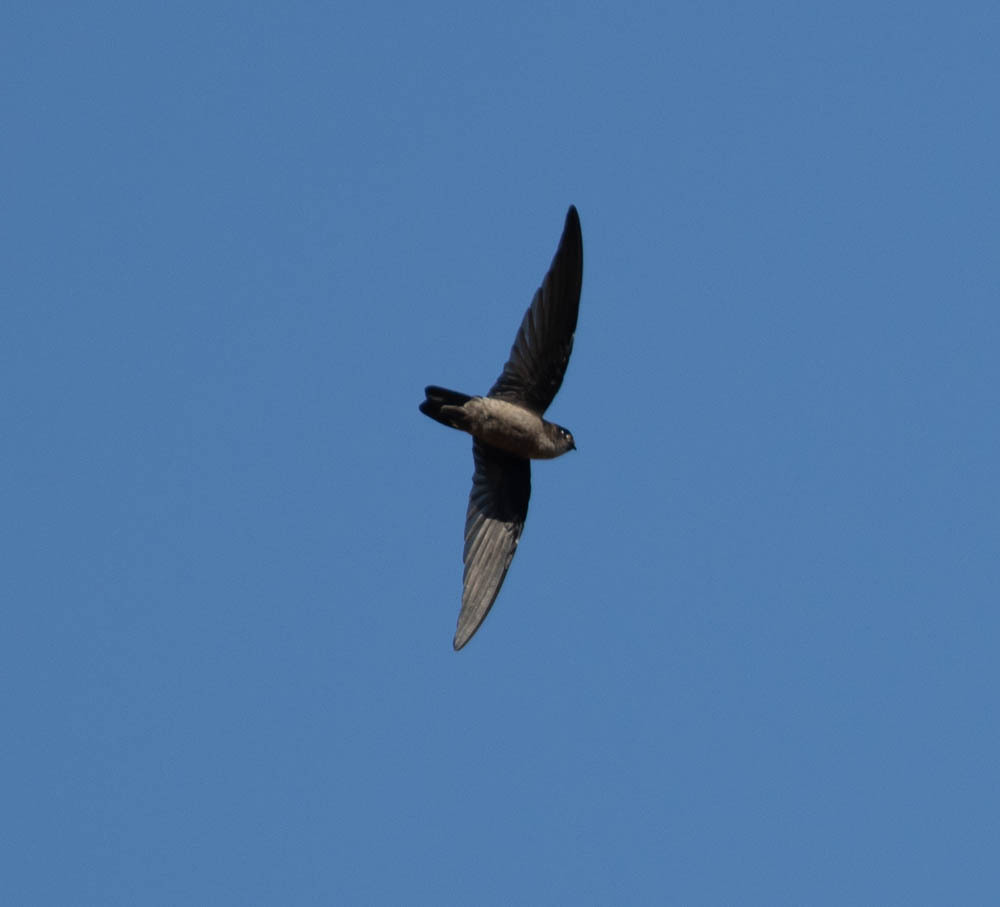

Conservation status
- Least Concern (IUCN 3.1)

Scientific classification
- Kingdom: Animalia
- Phylum: Chordata
- Class: Aves
- Order: Apodiformes
- Family: Apodidae
- Genus: Aerodramus
- Species: A. hirundinaceus

Binomial name
- Aerodramus hirundinaceus (Stresemann, 1914)

Synonyms
- Collocalia hirundinacea

= Mountain swiftlet =

Species of bird

The mountain swiftlet (Aerodramus hirundinaceus) is a species of swift in the family Apodidae. It is endemic to the island of New Guinea and the nearby islands of Karkar, Yapen and Goodenough. It was once placed in the genus Collocalia but has been moved, with many others, to Aerodramus. The species is divided into three subspecies, with the nominate, A. h. hirundinacea ranging over most of New Guinea, the subspecies A. h. excelsus occurring over 1600 m in the Snow Mountains and Cartenz peaks of Irian Jaya and A. h. baru being restricted to Yapen Island. It occurs in alpine areas from 500 m to the treeline. Its natural habitat is tropical moist montane forests and other mountainous habitats in New Guinea. It also occurs in lower numbers in the lowlands near hills.

The mountain swiftlet is a medium-sized swiftlet, 11–13 cm long. It has dark brown upperparts and paler grey undersides. The tail is slightly forked. The subspecies vary slightly from the nominate race, A. h. baru has browner underparts and darker upperparts, while A. h. excelsus is larger than the nominate race. Like other members of the genus this species is able to echolocate, a trait it uses to navigate itself in the caves it breeds in.

Like the rest of its genus it breeds in caves, constructing nests of vegetation such as ferns, rootlets and grasses, or lichens, held together with saliva. They are colonial, but the caves examined so far do not suggest that they nest densely. The peak of the breeding season is October through December, but there are occupied nests through most of the year. The clutch size is a single egg for this species. The nestling period, between 57 and 74 days, is one of the longer chick raising periods of any swifts. This is counteracted by a comparatively high breeding success rate, with 61% of mountain swiftlets successfully raising chicks.
