= Harry C. Oberholser =

American ornithologist

Harry Church Oberholser
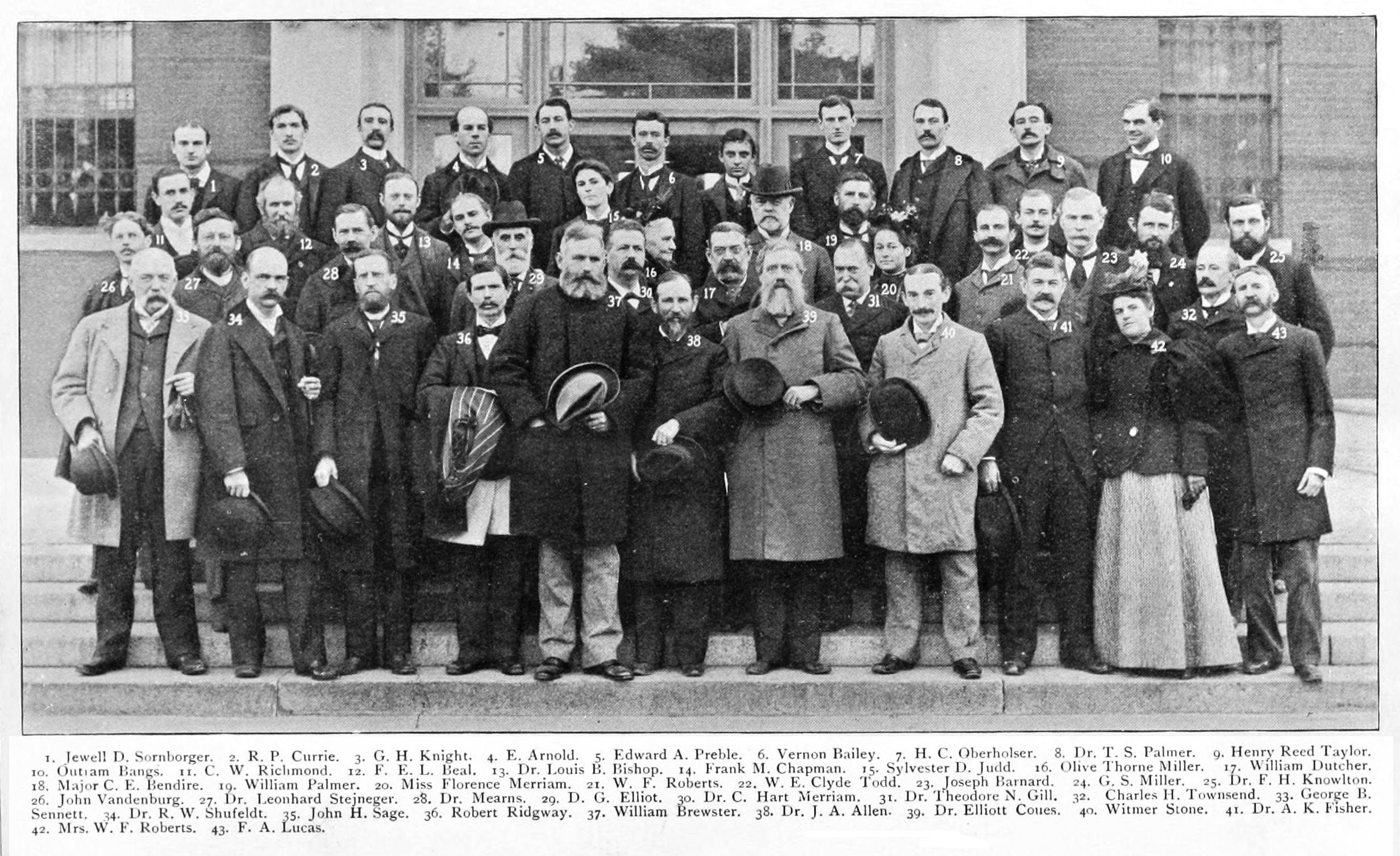
- H.C. Oberholser in 1895
- Born: June 25, 1870; Brooklyn, New York
- Died: December 25, 1963 (aged 93)
- Education: Columbia University; George Washington University
- Scientific career
- Fields: Ornithology
- Workplaces: United States Fish and Wildlife Service; Cleveland Museum of Natural History

Harry Church Oberholser (June 25, 1870 – December 25, 1963) was an American ornithologist.

== Biography ==
Harry Oberholser was born to Jacob and Lavera S. Oberholser on June 25, 1870, in Brooklyn, New York. He attended Columbia University, but did not graduate. Later, Oberholser was awarded degrees (B.A., M.S., and PhD.) from the George Washington University. He married Mary Forrest Smith on June 30, 1914.

From 1895 to 1941, he was employed by the United States Bureau of Biological Survey (later the United States Fish and Wildlife Service) as an ornithologist, biologist, and editor. During his career, he collected bird specimens while on trips with Vernon Bailey and Louis Agassiz Fuertes. In 1928, Oberholser helped organize the Winter Waterfowl Survey, which continues to this day.

In 1941, at the age of 70, he became curator of ornithology at the Cleveland Museum of Natural History. Oberholser was the author of a number of books and articles. A complete manuscript of his work is available at the Dolph Briscoe Center for American History.

He died on December 25, 1963.

== Memory ==
Empidonax oberholseri (dusky flycatcher) was named in his honor.

== Books ==
- The Bird Life of Texas (1974) ISBN 0-292-70711-8
- Birds of Mt. Kilimanjaro (1905)
- Birds of the Anamba Islands (1917)
- Birds of the Natuna Islands (1932)
- The Bird Life of Louisiana (1938)
- When Passenger Pigeons Flew in the Killbuck Valley (1999) ISBN 1-888683-96-1
- Critical notes on the subspecies of the spotted owl (1915) doi:10.5479/si.00963801.49-2106.251
- The birds of the Tambelan Islands, South China Sea (1919) doi:10.5479/si.00963801.55-2262.129
- The great plains waterfowl breeding grounds and their protection (1918)
