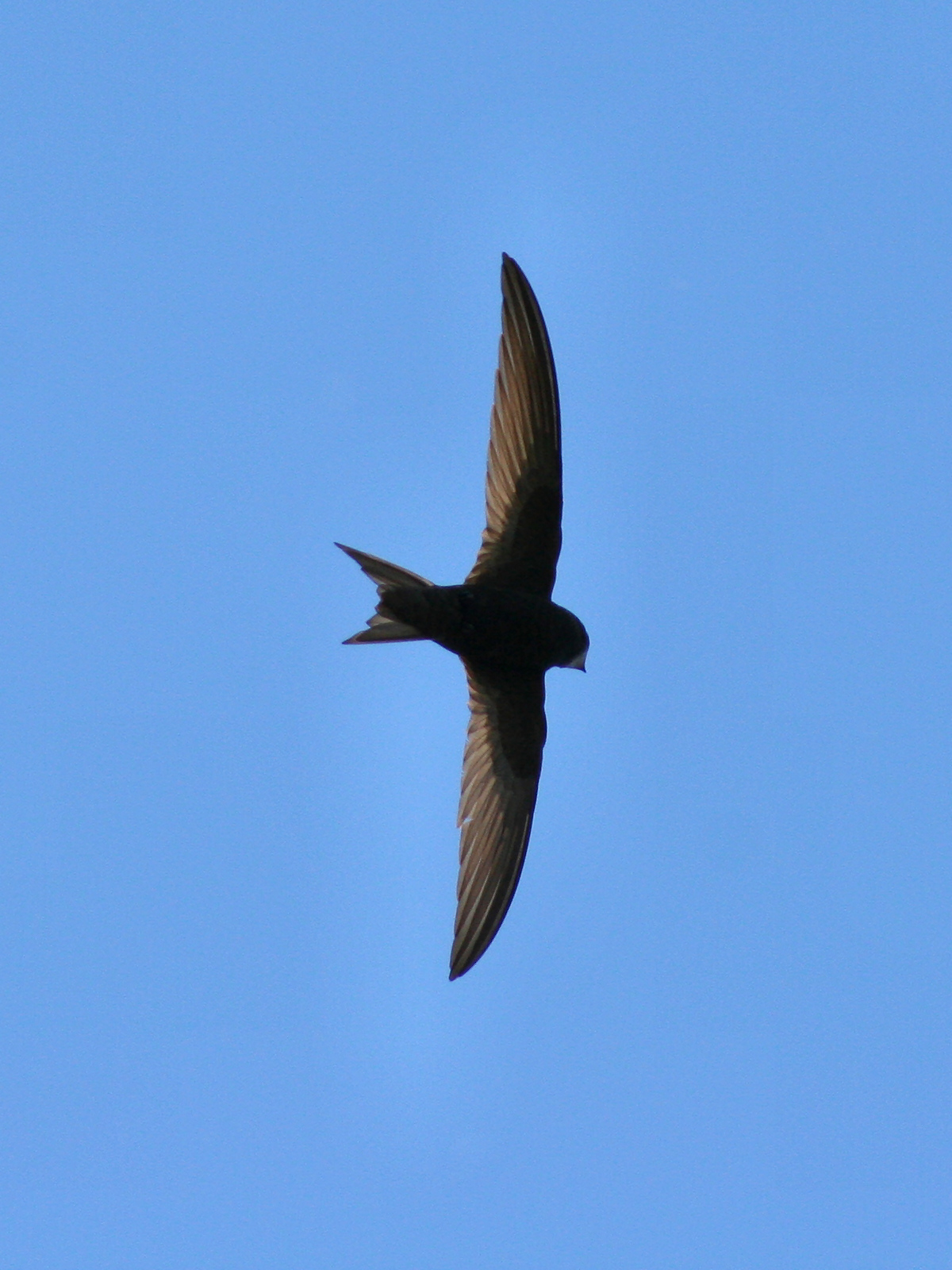
- Common swift, Apus apus

Scientific classification
- Kingdom: Animalia
- Phylum: Chordata
- Class: Aves
- Order: Apodiformes
- Family: Apodidae; Hartert, 1897

Subfamilies
- Cypseloidinae; Apodinae

= Swift (bird) =

Swift Temporal range: Eocene to present

Family of birds

The Apodidae, or swifts, form a family of highly aerial birds. They are superficially similar to swallows but are not closely related to any passerine species. Swifts are traditionally placed in the order Apodiformes, but they are being reconsidered by some (along with hummingbirds and treeswifts) as diurnal Caprimulgiformes based on new genetic evidence.

The treeswifts are closely related to the true swifts but form a separate family, the Hemiprocnidae.

Resemblances between swifts and swallows are due to convergent evolution, reflecting similar life styles based on catching insects in flight.

The family name, Apodidae, is derived from the Greek ἄπους (ápous), meaning "footless", a reference to the small, weak legs of these most aerial of birds. The tradition of depicting swifts without feet continued into the Middle Ages, as seen in the heraldic martlet.

== Taxonomy ==
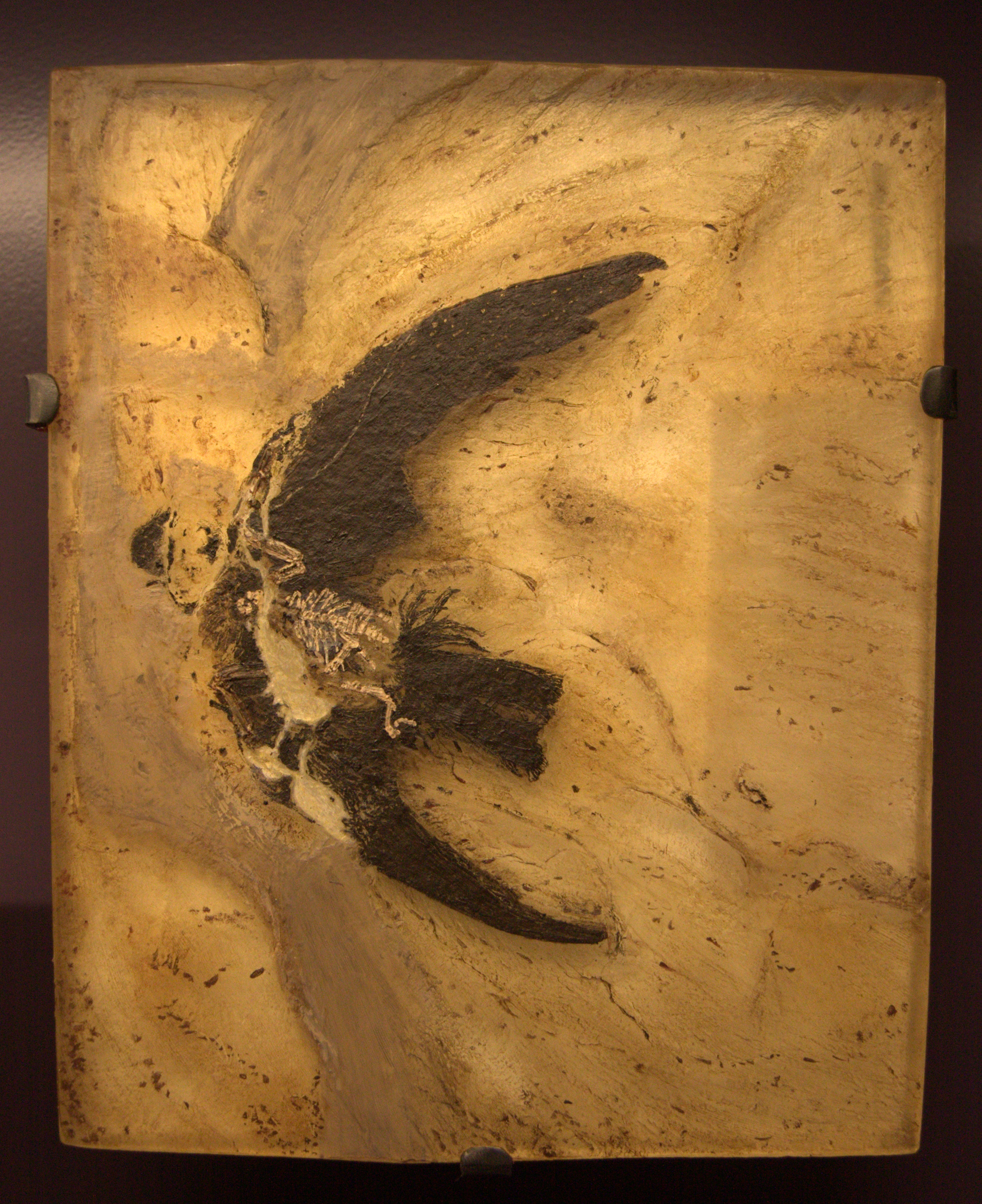
Scaniacypselus fossil

Taxonomists have long classified swifts and treeswifts as relatives of the hummingbirds, a judgment corroborated by the discovery of the Jungornithidae (apparently swift-like hummingbird-relatives) and of primitive hummingbirds such as Eurotrochilus. Traditional taxonomies place the hummingbird family (Trochilidae) in the same order as the swifts and treeswifts (and no other birds); the Sibley-Ahlquist taxonomy treated this group as a superorder in which the swift order was called Trochiliformes.

The taxonomy of the swifts is complicated, with genus and species boundaries widely disputed, especially amongst the swiftlets. Analysis of behavior and vocalizations is complicated by common parallel evolution, while analyses of different morphological traits and of various DNA sequences have yielded equivocal and partly contradictory results.

The Apodiformes diversified during the Eocene, at the end of which the extant families were present; fossil genera are known from all over temperate Europe, between today's Denmark and France, such as the primitive swift-like Scaniacypselus (Early–Middle Eocene) and the more modern Procypseloides (Late Eocene/Early Oligocene – Early Miocene). A prehistoric genus sometimes assigned to the swifts, Primapus (Early Eocene of England), might also be a more distant ancestor.

=== Species ===
There are around 100 species of swifts, normally grouped into two subfamilies and four tribes.

Cypseloidinae

- Tribe Cypseloidini

Apodinae

- Tribe Collocaliini – swiftlets
- Tribe Chaeturini – needletails
- Tribe Apodini – typical swifts

== Description ==
Swifts are among the fastest of birds in level flight, and larger species like the white-throated needletail have been reported travelling at up to 169 km/h (105 mph). Even the common swift can cruise at a maximum speed of 31 metres per second (112 km/h; 70 mph). In a single year the common swift can cover at least 200,000 km, and in a lifetime, about two million kilometers.

The wingtip bones of swiftlets are of proportionately greater length than those of most other birds. Changing the angle between the bones of the wingtips and forelimbs allows swifts to alter the shape and area of their wings to increase their efficiency and maneuverability at various speeds. They share with their relatives the hummingbirds a special ability to rotate their wings from the base, allowing the wing to remain rigid and fully extended and derive power on both the upstroke and downstroke. The downstroke produces both lift and thrust, while the upstroke produces a negative thrust (drag) that is 60% of the thrust generated during the downstrokes, but simultaneously it contributes lift that is also 60% of what is produced during the downstroke. This flight arrangement might benefit the bird's control and maneuverability in the air.

The swiftlets or cave swiftlets have developed a form of echolocation for navigating through dark cave systems where they roost. One species, the three-toed swiftlet, has recently been found to use this navigation at night outside its cave roost too.

== Distribution and habitat ==
Swifts occur on all the continents except Antarctica, but not in the far north, in large deserts, or on many oceanic islands. The swifts of temperate regions are strongly migratory and winter in the tropics. Some species can survive short periods of cold weather by entering torpor, a state similar to hibernation.

Many have a characteristic shape, with a short forked tail and very long swept-back wings that resemble a crescent or a boomerang. The flight of some species is characterised by a distinctive "flicking" action quite different from swallows. Swifts range in size from the pygmy swiftlet (Collocalia troglodytes), which weighs 5.4 g and measures 9 cm (3.5 in) long, to the purple needletail (Hirundapus celebensis), which weighs 184 g (6.5 oz) and measures 25 cm (9.8 in) long.

== Behaviour ==
=== Breeding ===
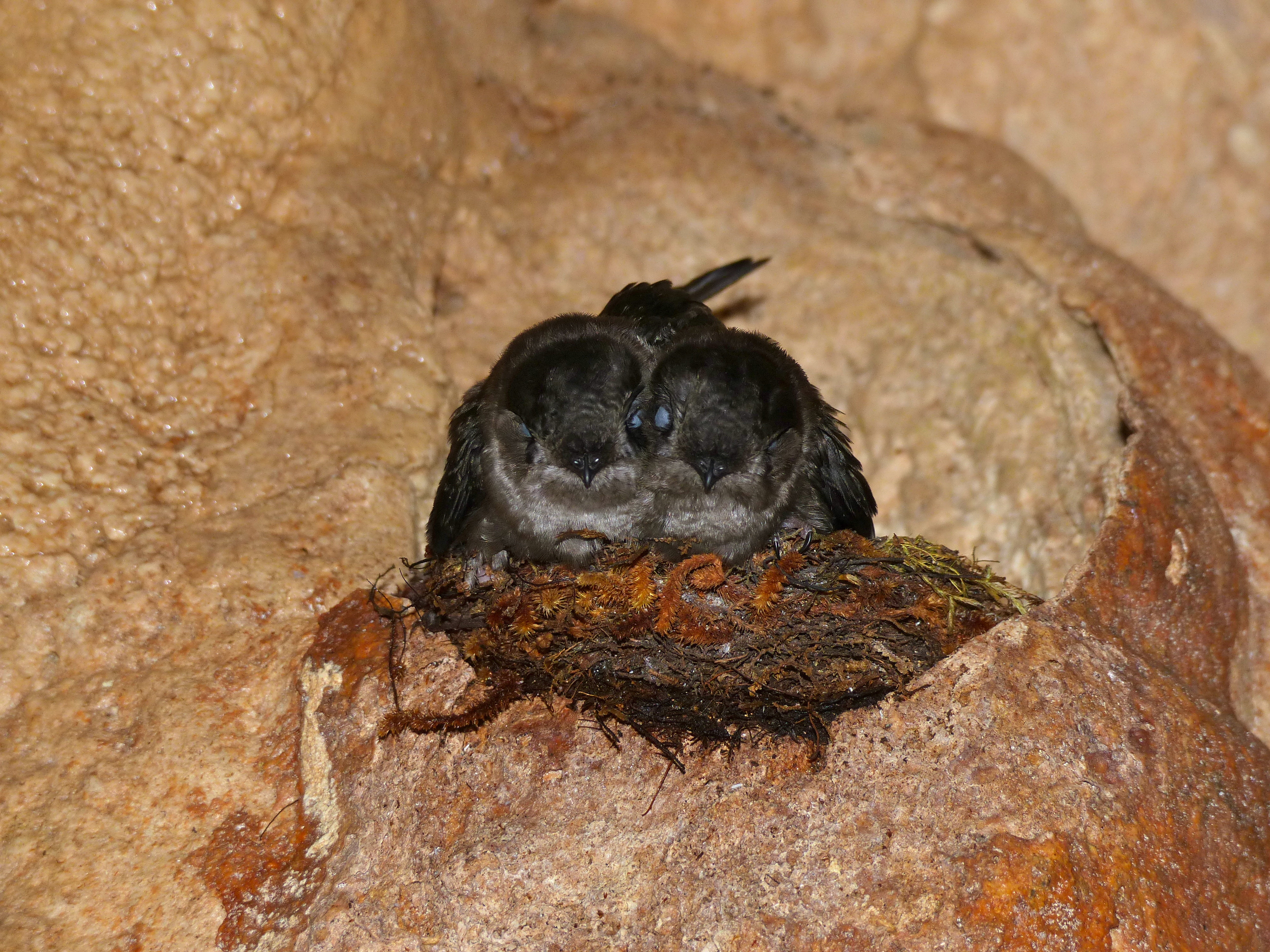
Nesting mossy-nest swiftlets

The nest of many species is glued to a vertical surface with saliva, and the genus Aerodramus use only that substance, which is the basis for bird's nest soup. Other swifts select holes and small cavities in walls. The eggs hatch after 19 to 23 days, and the young leave the nest after a further six to eight weeks. Both parents assist in raising the young.

Swifts as a family have smaller egg clutches and much longer and more variable incubation and fledging times than passerines with similarly sized eggs, resembling tubenoses in these developmental factors. Young birds reach a maximum weight heavier than their parents; they can cope with not being fed for long periods of time, and delay their feather growth when undernourished. Swifts and seabirds have generally secure nest sites, but their food sources are unreliable, whereas passerines are vulnerable in the nest but food is usually plentiful.

=== Feeding ===
All swifts eat insects, such as dragonflies, flies, ants, aphids, wasps and bees, as well as aerial spiders. Prey is typically caught in flight using the beak. Some species, like the chimney swift, hunt in mixed species flocks with other aerial insectivores such as members of Hirundinidae (swallows).

== Status ==
No swift species has become extinct since 1600, but BirdLife International lists the Atiu, Seychelles, and Mariana swiftlets and the ashy-tailed, American black and chimney swifts as vulnerable; eight other species are near threatened or lack sufficient data for classification.

== Exploitation by humans ==
The hardened saliva nests of the edible-nest swiftlet and the black-nest swiftlet have been used in Chinese cooking for over 400 years, most often as bird's nest soup. Over-harvesting of this expensive delicacy has led to a decline in the numbers of these swiftlets, especially as the nests are also thought to have health benefits and aphrodisiac properties. Most nests are built during the breeding season by the male swiftlet over a period of 35 days. They take the shape of a shallow cup stuck to the cave wall. The nests are composed of interwoven strands of salivary cement and contain high levels of calcium, iron, potassium, and magnesium.

== See also ==
- Swift brick
- List of Apodiformes by population
- List of birds by flight speed
- International Swift Conference

== Bibliography ==
- Chantler, Phillip; Driessens, Gerald (2000). Swifts: A Guide to the Swifts and Treeswifts of the World. London: Pica Press. ISBN 1-873403-83-6.
- Jobling, James A (2010). The Helm Dictionary of Scientific Bird Names. London: Christopher Helm. ISBN 978-1-4081-2501-4.
- Kaufman, Kenn (2001). Lives of North American Birds. Oxford: Houghton Mifflin Harcourt. ISBN 0-618-15988-6.
