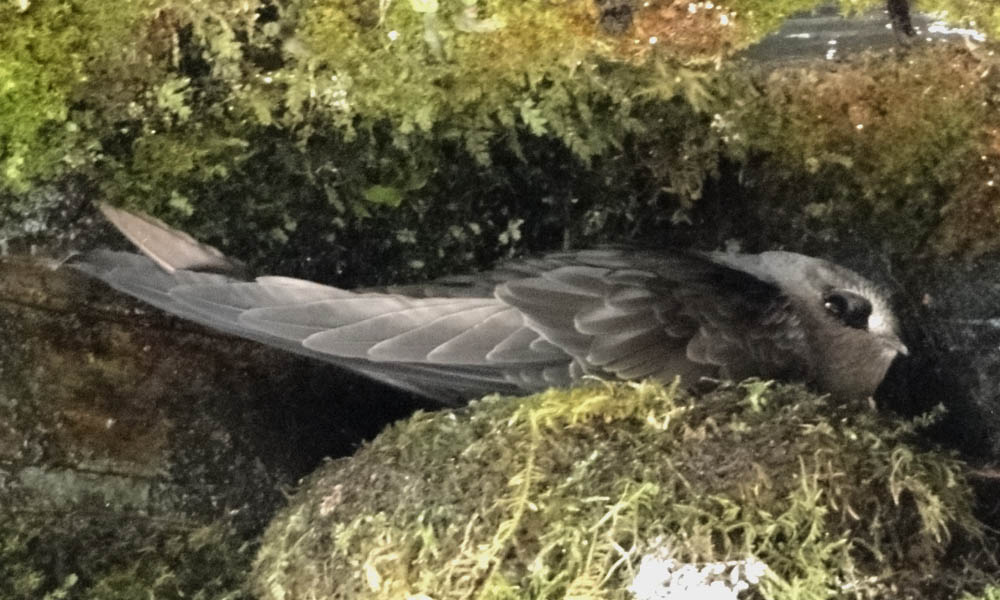
- American black swift (Cypseloides niger)

Scientific classification
- Domain: Eukaryota
- Kingdom: Animalia
- Phylum: Chordata
- Class: Aves
- Clade: Strisores
- Order: Apodiformes
- Family: Apodidae
- Subfamily: Cypseloidinae; Bonaparte, 1838

= Cypseloidinae =

Subfamily of birds

The Cypseloidinae are a subfamily of swifts and contain the following species:

- Genus Cypseloides

- Spot-fronted swift (Cypseloides cherriei)
- White-chinned swift (Cypseloides cryptus)
- Sooty swift (Cypseloides fumigatus)
- White-chested swift (Cypseloides lemosi)
- Rothschild's swift (Cypseloides rothschildi)
- Great dusky swift (Cypseloides senex)
- White-fronted swift (Cypseloides storeri)
- American black swift (Cypseloides niger)

Subspecies: C. n. borealis, C. n. costaricensis, & C. n. niger

- Genus Streptoprocne

- Biscutate swift (Streptoprocne biscutata)

Subspecies: S. b. seridoensis, & S. b. biscutata

- Tepui swift (Streptoprocne phelpsi)
- White-naped swift (Streptoprocne semicollaris)
- White-collared swift (Streptoprocne zonaris)

Subspecies: S. z. mexicana, S. z. bouchellii, S. z. pallidifrons, S. z. minor,
S. z. albicincta, S. z. subtropicalis, S. z. altissima, S. z. kuenzeli, & S. z. zonaris

- Chestnut-collared swift (Streptoprocne rutila)

Subspecies: S. r. griseifrons, S. r. brunnitorques. & S. r. rutila
