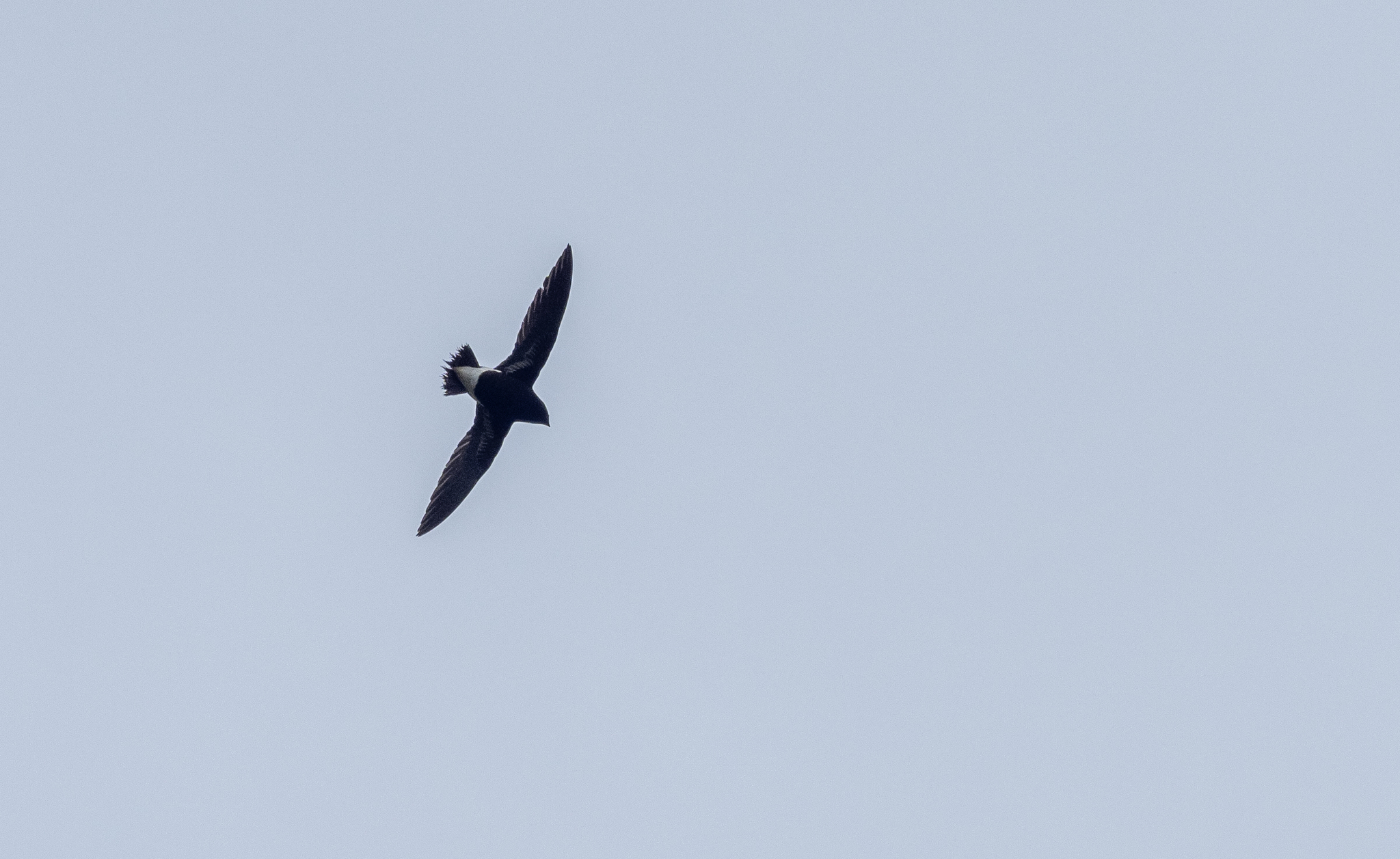

Conservation status
- Least Concern (IUCN 3.1)

Scientific classification
- Kingdom: Animalia
- Phylum: Chordata
- Class: Aves
- Clade: Strisores
- Order: Apodiformes
- Family: Apodidae
- Genus: Hirundapus
- Species: H. celebensis

Binomial name
- Hirundapus celebensis (Sclater, PL, 1866)

Synonyms
- Chaetura gigantea var. celebensis

= Purple needletail =

Species of swift

The purple needletail (Hirundapus celebensis), or hagibas in Tagalog, is arguably the largest swift in the world. It is native to the Philippine archipelago and the Minahasa Peninsula (Sulawesi).

== Description ==
This bird is a huge swift, measuring on average about 25 cm (9.8 in) long and weighing from 170 to 203 g (6.0 to 7.2 oz), with an average of 180 g (6.3 oz) in one study of 22 unsexed adult birds. The wingspan can range up to 60 cm (24 in), with a wing chord length of 20.3 to 23.4 cm (8.0 to 9.2 in). Only the related brown-backed needletail of Southeast Asia and the white-naped swift of Central America rival this species for size and wingspan, with the latter averaging 5 g (0.18 oz) less than this needletail in weight. The overall plumage is mostly uniform blackish, with a whitish loral marking. This species has the large size, white horseshoe-shaped underside-marking, and the subtly-needled tail typical of the needletails. Compared to other needletails, it is extremely dark and lacks the pale throat patch of white-throated needletail and silver-backed needletail. Purple needletail has white-lores, like the nominate form of white-throated needletail and brown-backed needletail, but has distinctive diagonal white bars from the central to inner hind edge of the underwing and has an overall deep purple gloss, visible in strong light.

Few detailed descriptions of the life history of the purple needletail are known. It is a gregarious species, probably never leaving a group of at least 20 birds. The large size of these swifts is said to be apparent even from a distance. It is believed to take any kind of large, flying insect; sometimes even hanging around bee-farms to pick off members of a hive. Their breeding habits are unknown, although it is thought that this is a cave-nesting bird. The voice is also unknown.

== Distribution and habitat ==
The abundance of this species is not well known. They are thought to be scarce to uncommon through most of their range, but not endangered and numerous in some parts of the Philippines.

This bird lives in various forests and open country. They may be found in the lowlands or in hills, from 150–2,000 m (490–6,560 ft) high in elevation.
