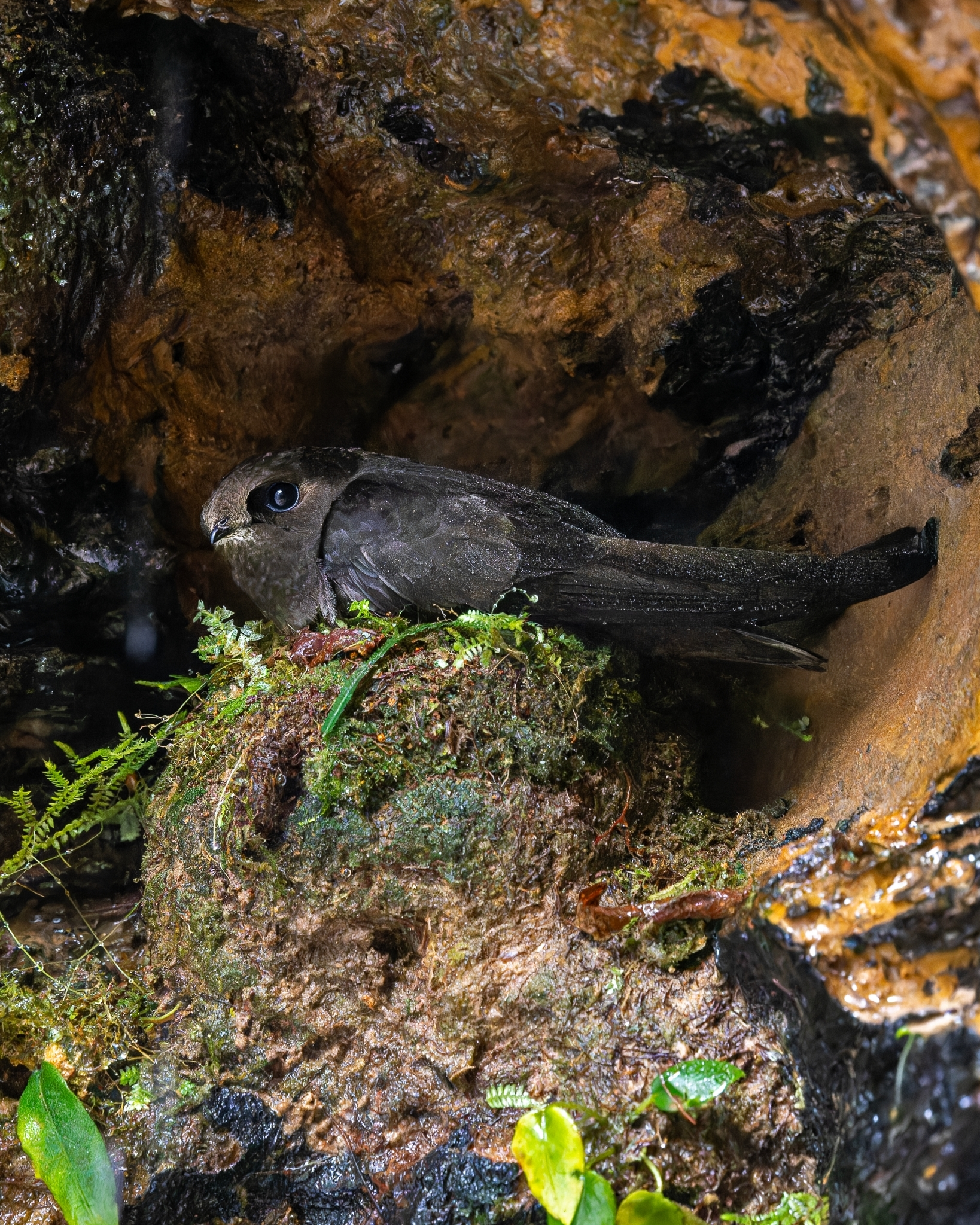

Conservation status
- Least Concern (IUCN 3.1)

Scientific classification
- Kingdom: Animalia
- Phylum: Chordata
- Class: Aves
- Order: Apodiformes
- Family: Apodidae
- Genus: Cypseloides
- Species: C. cryptus

Binomial name
- Cypseloides cryptus Zimmer, 1945

= White-chinned swift =

Species of bird

The white-chinned swift (Cypseloides cryptus) is a species of swift in the family Apodidae. It is found from Mexico south through most Central America countries into South America as far south as Peru and east as far as Suriname.

== Taxonomy and systematics ==
The white-chinned swift is monotypic. Some authors consider it and the white-fronted swift (Cypseloides storeri) to form a superspecies. Others consider it more closely related to the sooty swift (C. fumigatus) and Rothschild's swift (C. rothschildi) or that all three of them are a single species.

== Description ==
The white-chinned swift is about 15 cm (5.9 in) long and weighs about 35 g (1.2 oz). The sexes are alike. They have a dark brown crown and cheeks, a short white streak above the eye, a white chin, and a dark brown throat. Their back and rump are blackish brown and the wings and tail slightly darker. Their undersides are paler than the back and rump and the underside of the wing is paler than the upper side.

== Distribution and habitat ==
The white-chinned swift is widely but very patchily distributed. It has been confirmed to nest only in Costa Rica and at one location in northern Brazil. There are sight records in Mexico and very few confirmed records in Belize, Guatemala, Honduras, Nicaragua, and Panama. There are somewhat more records in Colombia, Ecuador, Guyana, Peru, Suriname, and Venezuela. It has occurred as a vagrant in French Guiana and there is at least one sight record in Bolivia.

The white-chinned swift has mostly been recorded over evergreen montane and lowland forests, but also occurs at pastures and young secondary forest. In elevation it ranges from sea level to 3,000 m (9,800 ft).

== Behavior ==
=== Migration ===
Whether the white-chinned swift is resident or migratory at any of its locations is unknown.

=== Feeding ===
Like all swifts, the white-chinned is an aerial insectivore. Its prey includes Hymenoptera, Coleoptera, Diptera, Lepidoptera, Hemiptera, and Homoptera. It usually forages in flocks, often with other swifts.

=== Breeding ===
Most information about the white-chinned swift's breeding is from Costa Rica. There it lays eggs from early May into early June. It builds a nest of moss, liverworts, and mud on a rock wall near or behind a waterfall. It is usually in a crevice or under a small overhang and often has overhanging vegetation. The clutch size is one egg. The incubation period is about 30 days and fledging occurs 55 to 58 days after hatch. At the one Brazilian nesting location, nests were active in July. The construction and siting of nests was similar to those in Costa Rica but the incubation length and time to fledging are not known.

=== Vocalization ===
The white-chinned swift's vocalizations have been described as "sharp chips and more melodious chirping notes; also explosive, staccato clicking notes", and they also make "single dry tick notes".

== Status ==
The IUCN has assessed the white-chinned swift as being of Least Concern. It is widespread and has an estimated population of 20,000 to 50,000 mature individuals, though the latter is believed to be decreasing. No immediate threats have been identified. "This species is poorly known...and it has been found breeding at only a few sites."
