= Tepui swift =

Conservation status
- Least Concern (IUCN 3.1)

Scientific classification
- Kingdom: Animalia
- Phylum: Chordata
- Class: Aves
- Clade: Strisores
- Order: Apodiformes
- Family: Apodidae
- Genus: Streptoprocne
- Species: S. phelpsi

Binomial name
- Streptoprocne phelpsi (Collins, 1972)

Synonyms
- Cypseloides phelpsi Collins, 1972

Species of bird

The tepui swift (Streptoprocne phelpsi) is a species of bird in subfamily Cypseloidinae of the swift family Apodidae. It is found in Brazil, Guyana, and Venezuela.

== Taxonomy and systematics ==
What is now the tepui swift was first collected in the 19th century but was not recognized as a separate species until 1972. It was originally assigned to genus Cypseloides but by the 2000s was reassigned to Streptoprocne. It and the chestnut-collared swift (C. rutila) form a superspecies. Its specific epithet honors William H. Phelps Jr.

The tepui swift is monotypic.

== Description ==
The tepui swift is one of the smaller members of genus Streptoprocne. It is 14 to 16 cm (5.5 to 6.3 in) long and weighs about 20 to 24 g (0.71 to 0.85 oz). It has a long deeply notched tail and long broad wings. Adult males' most obvious feature is the wide orange-chestnut collar that encircles the neck and includes the upper breast, chin, throat, and most of the face. The rest of its plumage is sooty black, at times with a few white feathers on the breast below the collar. Adult females are similar to males though some have a paler breast with brown mixed in. Immatures resemble adults with the addition of pale gray edges to the underparts' feathers.

== Distribution and habitat ==
The tepui swift is found in the tepui area where southeastern Venezuela, western Guyana, and far northwestern Brazil meet. One individual has been documented in far northern Venezuela; it is not known if it was a vagrant or a migrant. The species is found in humid montane and lowland forests, montane grasslands, and around cliffs. In elevation it mostly ranges between 200 and 2,200 m (660 and 7,200 ft) but has occurred as high as 2,630 m (8,600 ft).

== Behavior ==
=== Movement ===
The tepui swift is thought to be a year-round resident in its range but reports from elsewhere hint at the possibility that it is migratory.

=== Feeding ===
Like all swifts, the tepui is an aerial insectivore, but little is known about the details of its diet. It often feeds in flocks of 10 to 20 or more that sometimes include white-collared swifts (Streptoprocne zonaris).

=== Breeding ===
The tepui swift's breeding biology is not well known. It apparently mostly nests in the northern hemisphere's late spring and early summer, though a nest with a nearly full grown nestling was photographed in early September. Few nests have been found; they were on cliffs and in rocky grottos. The early September nest was a cup of rootlets and moss on a rock shelf in a cave. There is some suggestion that the species nests in colonies.

=== Vocalization ===
The tepui swift appears to have two flight calls, "a squeak followed by a trill and short squeals, squeek, titititititititi sui, squi, squi..." and "a slow series of reedy or hissing tic notes".

== Status ==
The IUCN has assessed the tepui swift as being of Least Concern, though its population size is unknown and believed to be decreasing. No immeditate threats have been identified. It is considered uncommon to fairly common, and "[a]t least in the short term, human activity probably has little effect on Tepui Swift, although it may be vulnerable in the long term to deforestation".
