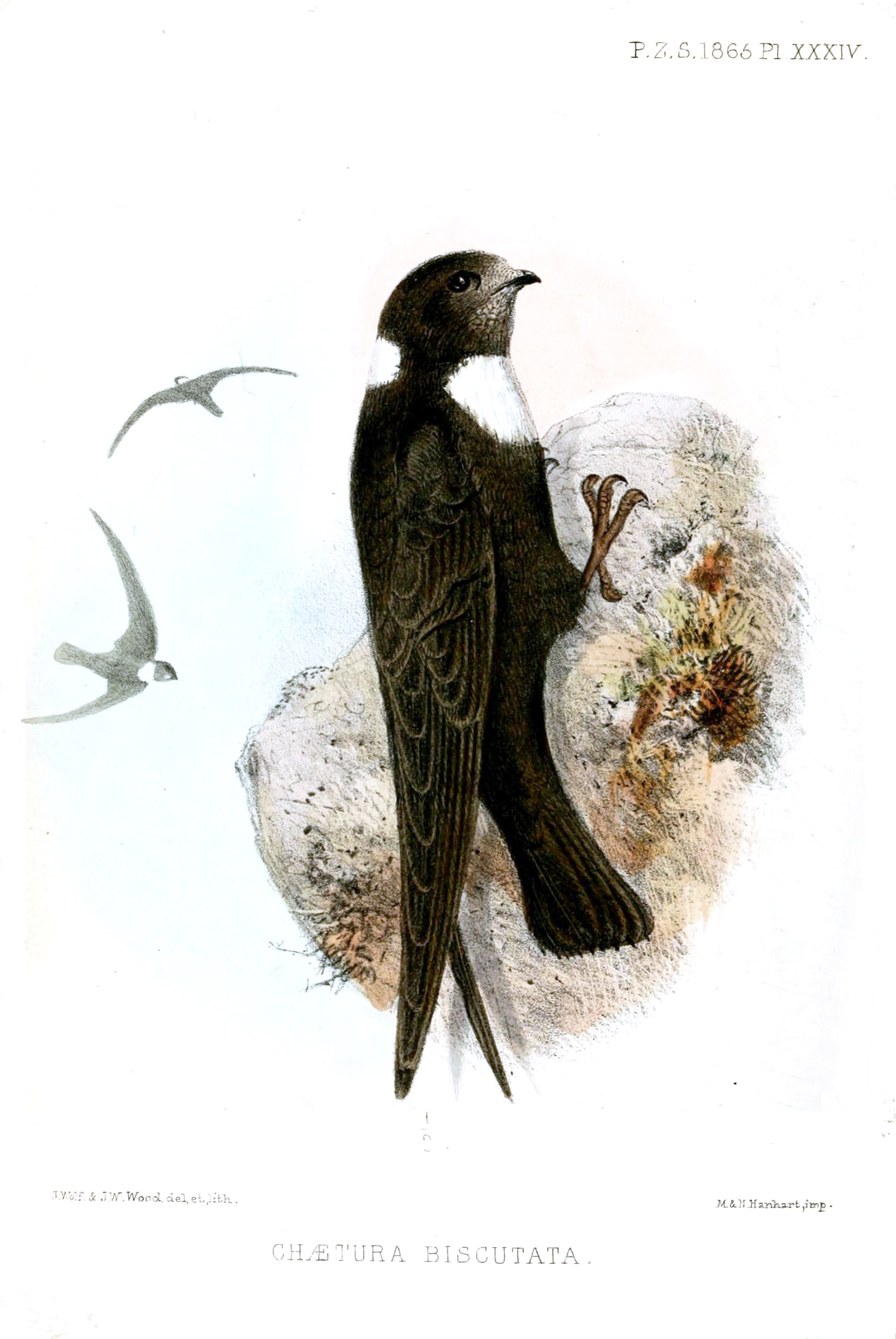

Conservation status
- Least Concern (IUCN 3.1)

Scientific classification
- Kingdom: Animalia
- Phylum: Chordata
- Class: Aves
- Clade: Strisores
- Order: Apodiformes
- Family: Apodidae
- Genus: Streptoprocne
- Species: S. biscutata

Binomial name
- Streptoprocne biscutata (Sclater, PL, 1866)

= Biscutate swift =

Species of bird

The biscutate swift (Streptoprocne biscutata) is a species of bird in subfamily Cypseloidinae of the swift family Apodidae. It is found in Argentina, Bolivia, Brazil, and possibly Paraguay.

== Taxonomy and systematics ==
The biscutate swift has two subspecies, the nominate S. b. biscutata and S. b. seridoensis.

== Description ==
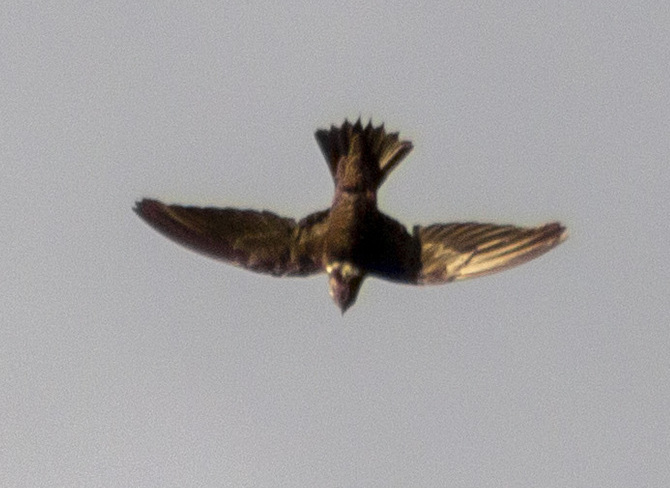
In flight

The biscutate swift is about 22 cm (8.7 in) long and weighs about 115 g (4.1 oz). It has an almost square tail and the sexes have the same plumage. Adults of the nominate subspecies have a sooty brown head that is lighter on the forehead, chin, and around the eyes. Their body is sooty blackish brown except for a wide white band across the breast and a narrow white band on the nape and somewhat on the sides of the neck; the bands do not meet. The wing and tail feathers are blackish on their outer webs and pale gray brown on the inner ones. Juveniles are similar to adults with the addition of grayish white edges to the belly feathers and the tips of the tail. Subspecies S. b. seridoensis has essentially the same plumage as the nominate but is smaller.

== Distribution and habitat ==
The nominate subspecies of biscutate swift is found from Minas Gerais in southeastern Brazil into Argentina's Misiones Province; at least one record has also been confirmed in Bolivia. A sight record in Paraguay leads the South American Classification Committee of the American Ornithological Society to label it hypothetical in that country. S. b. seridoensis is found further north in Brazil but its full range is not known. It has been documented from Piauí and Rio Grande do Norte south at least into Bahia.

== Behavior ==
=== Migration ===
The biscutate swift is a year-round resident in southern Brazil. It is found in the far north of its range only during the austral winter months of February to October, and the breeding range of this population is not known. It inhabits a variety of landscapes including montane and lowland evergreen forest, temperate forest, tropical deciduous forest, and more open habitats like scrublands.

=== Feeding ===
Like all swifts, the biscutate is an aerial insectivore. It forages mostly in single-species flocks but sometimes with white-collared swifts (S. zonaris). Details of its diet are lacking but it is assumed to be similar to that of others of its genus; insects of many orders are their prey.

=== Breeding ===
The biscutate swift breeds colonially in caves. It builds a nest of lichen, bryophytes, other plant material, and soil on a ledge or adhering to a vertical wall. The clutch size is one to four eggs. Both parents incubate the eggs and care for the young. The incubation period is about 24 days and fledging occurs about 33 days after hatch.

=== Vocalization ===
The biscutate swift's principal vocalization is described as "chee chee chee chee chee..." or "weep-weep-weep".

== Status ==
The IUCN has assessed the biscutate swift as being of Least Concern. It has a large range, but its population size is unknown and believed to be decreasing. No immediate threats have been identified. "No direct effects of human activity on the Biscutate Swift have been documented" but collisions with wires, bioaccumulation of pesticides, and changes in insect populations due to climate change are possible threats.
