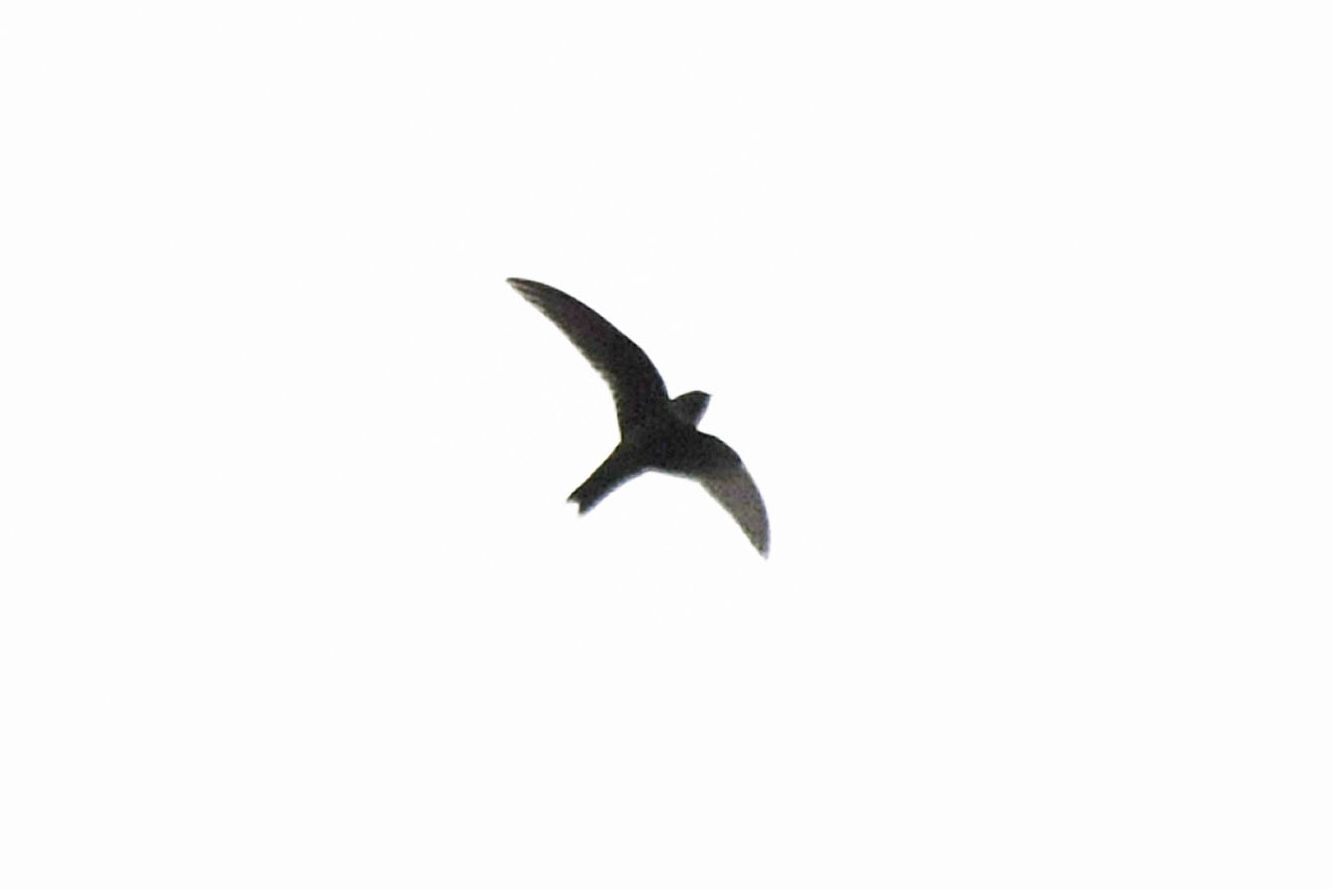

Conservation status
- Least Concern (IUCN 3.1)

Scientific classification
- Kingdom: Animalia
- Phylum: Chordata
- Class: Aves
- Clade: Strisores
- Order: Apodiformes
- Family: Apodidae
- Genus: Cypseloides
- Species: C. lemosi

Binomial name
- Cypseloides lemosi Eisenmann & Lehmann, 1962

= White-chested swift =

Species of bird

The white-chested swift (Cypseloides lemosi) is a species of bird in subfamily Cypseloidinae of the swift family Apodidae. It is found in Bolivia, Colombia, Ecuador, Peru, and possibly Brazil.

== Taxonomy and systematics ==
The white-chested swift, American black swift (Cypseloides niger), Rothschild's swift (C. rothschildi), and sooty swift (C. fumigatus) form a superspecies. The white-chested swift is monotypic.

== Description ==
The white-chested swift is 14 to 15 cm (5.5 to 5.9 in) long and weighs about 28 g (0.99 oz). Both sexes have a notched tail, with the male's notch being deeper. The sexes have the same plumage. Adults have sooty blackish upperparts with a faint green gloss on the crown and back and bluish wings and tail. They are black between the bill and eye. They have a large white patch across the breast that is wider in the middle. The rest of their underparts are paler than the upperparts and slightly brownish. Immatures do not have the white breast band; they are dark slaty gray with white tips to most of the feathers of the underparts.

== Distribution and habitat ==
The white-chested swift is known from widely scattered locations from Colombia's Cauca River valley south along the east slope of the Andes in Ecuador and into Peru as far south as Cuzco Department, and also east into Bolivia. An unconfirmed sight record in Brazil leads the South American Classification Committee of the American Ornithological Society to treat the species as hypothetical in that country. The white-chested swift has mostly been recorded over evergreen montane and lowland forests, but also occurs at pastures and young secondary forest.

== Behavior ==
=== Migration ===
Because breeding by white-chested swifts has not been documented at any site, it is not known if the species is resident or migratory at any of them.

=== Feeding ===
Like all swifts, the white-chested is an aerial insectivore. Its diet is not known in detail but it has been observed feeding on small beetles. It usually forages in flocks, often with other swifts.

=== Breeding ===
Nothing is known about the white-chested swift's breeding phenology. It is assumed to nest on cliffs near water like others of its genus.

=== Vocalization ===
The white-chested swift's calls have been described as "a rapid, piping pi'pi'pi-pee pee and single tip and pee notes."

== Status ==
The IUCN has assessed the white-chested swift as being of Least Concern, though it has a small known range and an unknown population size that is believed to be decreasing. No immediate threats have been identified. "The conservation status of White-chested Swift is difficult to assess adequately, however, until the breeding range of this species is ascertained."
