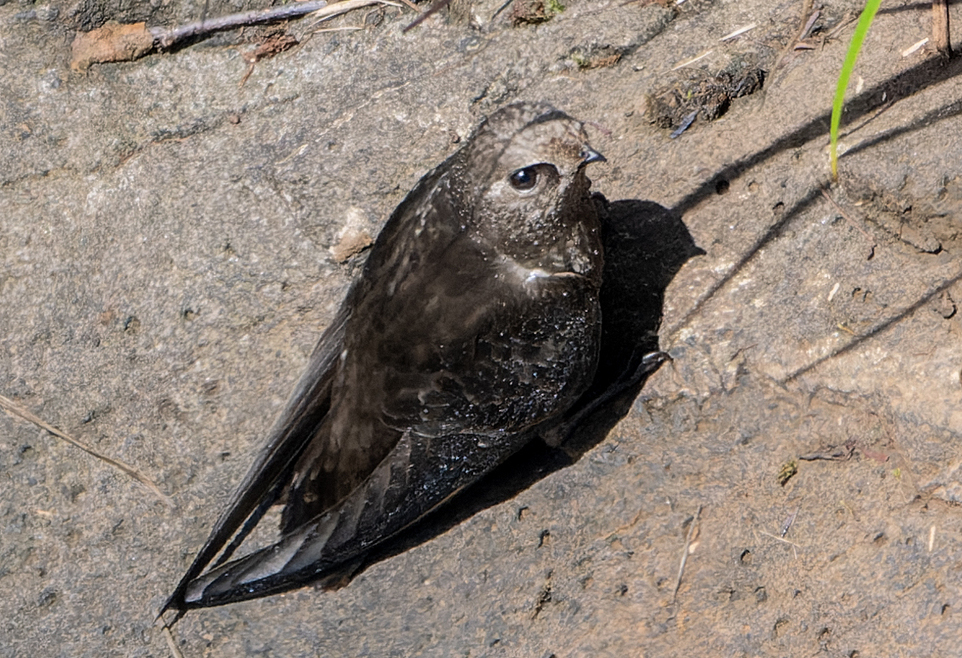

Conservation status
- Least Concern (IUCN 3.1)

Scientific classification
- Kingdom: Animalia
- Phylum: Chordata
- Class: Aves
- Order: Apodiformes
- Family: Apodidae
- Genus: Cypseloides
- Species: C. senex

Binomial name
- Cypseloides senex (Temminck, 1826)

Synonyms
- Aerornis senex

= Great dusky swift =

Species of bird

The great dusky swift (Cypseloides senex) is a species of bird in subfamily Cypseloidinae of the swift family Apodidae. It is found in Argentina, Brazil, Paraguay, and possibly Bolivia.

== Taxonomy and systematics ==
The great dusky swift is monotypic.

== Description ==
The great dusky swift is the largest member of genus Cypseloides. It is 18 cm (7.1 in) long and weighs 56 to 110 g (2.0 to 3.9 oz). The sexes have the same plumage. Adults have a chocolate brown crown and throat with pale gray edges to the feathers, giving a frosted appearance to the face. Their back is a darker brown, their rump a brown intermediate between the head and back, and their tail blackish brown. Their undersides are a paler brown than the back. The upper side of the wing is mostly brown and the underside somewhat lighter. Juveniles are very similar to adults with the addition on pale fringes to the wing feathers.

== Distribution and habitat ==
The great dusky swift is found in Brazil from southern Pará and much of Mato Grosso east into Bahia and south to Rio Grande do Sul, in eastern Paraguay, and in northeastern Argentina's Misiones Province. Undocumented sight records in Bolivia lead the South American Classification Committee of the American Ornithological Society to treat it as hypothetical in that country. Its principal habitats are tropical evergreen forest, temperate forest, and second-growth scrublands. The species roosts around waterfalls and is known for flying through the Iguazu Falls on the border of Brazil and Argentina.

== Behavior ==
=== Migration ===
The great dusky swift is believed to be a year-round resident throughout its range.

=== Feeding ===
Like all swifts, the great dusky is an aerial insectivore. Its diet is not known in detail but includes insects of at least five families. It often feeds in flocks that sometimes include white-collared swifts (Streptoprocne zonaris).

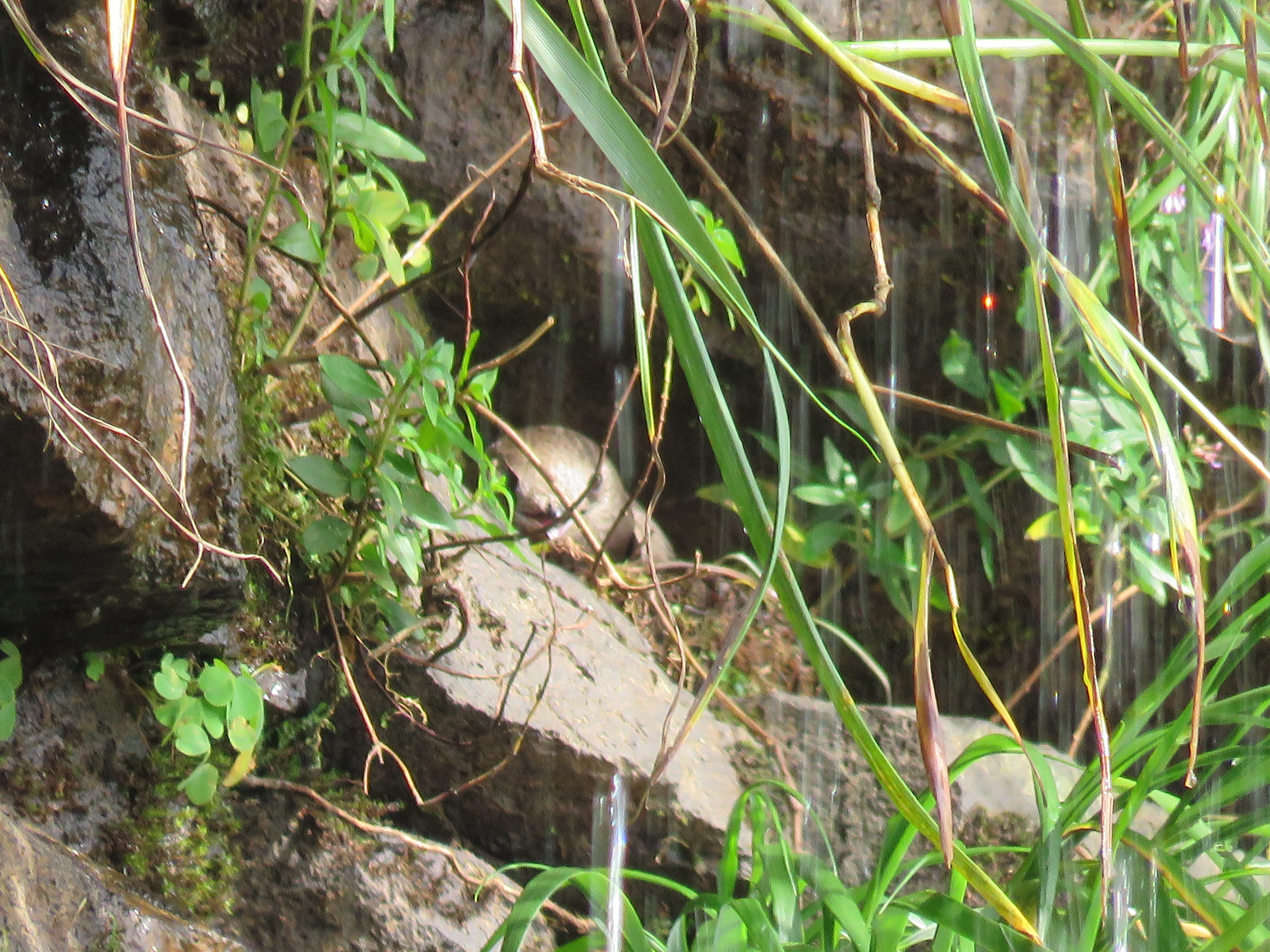
Great dusky swift on nest

=== Breeding ===
The great dusky swift nests in large colonies on a cliff, either beside or behind a waterfall. The nest is made of moss and pebbles cemented with mud.

=== Vocalization ===
The great dusky swift's principal vocalization is described as "a ti-ti-ti sound followed by a buzz, tirr-tshaarr."

== Status ==
The IUCN has assessed the great dusky swift as being of Least Concern. It has a large range, and though its population size is not known it is believed to be stable. No immediate threats have been identified. It is "potentially is threatened by the building of dams, as the construction of dams could flood waterfalls, interfering with the breeding and roosting locations of this species."
