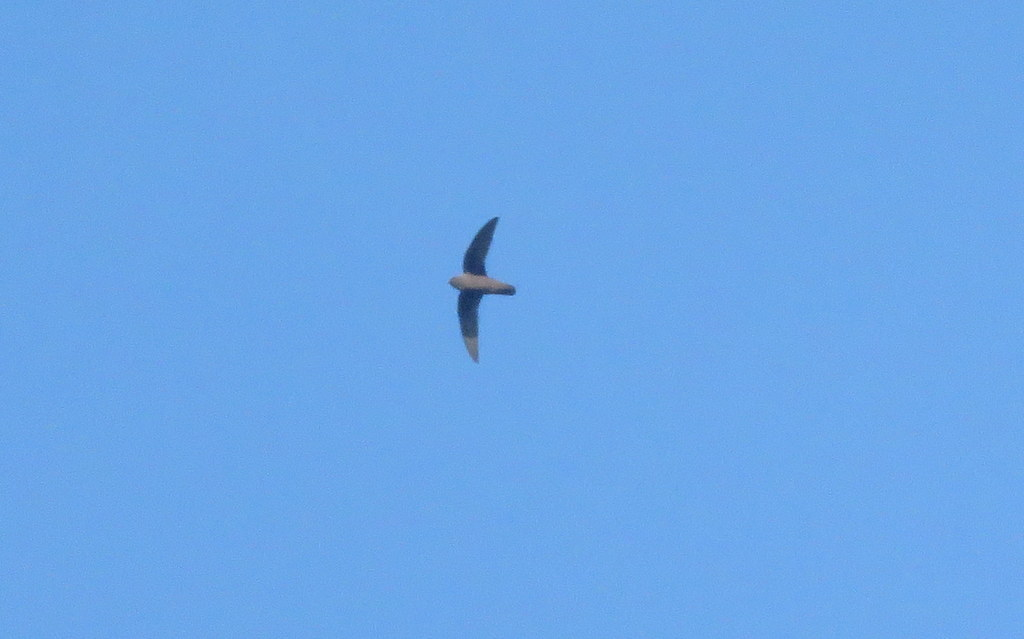

Conservation status
- Least Concern (IUCN 3.1)

Scientific classification
- Kingdom: Animalia
- Phylum: Chordata
- Class: Aves
- Order: Apodiformes
- Family: Apodidae
- Genus: Cypseloides
- Species: C. rothschildi

Binomial name
- Cypseloides rothschildi Zimmer, 1945

= Rothschild's swift =

Species of bird

Rothschild's swift (Cypseloides rothschildi) is a Near Threatened species of bird in subfamily Cypseloidinae of the swift family Apodidae. It is found in Argentina and Bolivia.

== Taxonomy and systematics ==
Rothschild's swift, white-chested swift, (Cypseloides lemosi), American black swift (C. niger), and sooty swift (C. fumigatus) form a superspecies. Some authors have treated Rothschild's and sooty swifts as conspecific. Rothschild's swift is monotypic.

== Description ==
Rothschild's swift is about 15 cm (5.9 in) long. It has long, broad wings and a short squarish tail. Its plumage is a uniform medium brown.

== Distribution and habitat ==
Rothschild's swift is found from Bolivia's Santa Cruz Department south into northwestern Argentina as far as Córdoba Province. There are no records in Peru despite its being included there in some taxonomic lists. The species' habitat requirements are not well known. Most records have been over evergreen montane forest at elevations between 500 and 2,000 m (1,600 and 6,600 ft).

== Behavior ==
=== Migration ===
Rothschild's swift appears to be a year-round resident in most of its range, though it might winter at the northern end of it.

=== Feeding ===
Like all swifts, Rothschild's is an aerial insectivore, but no details of its diet are known.

=== Breeding ===
Nothing is known about Rothschild's swift's breeding phenology.

=== Vocalization ===
As of late 2022, xeno-canto had a single recording of a Rothschild's swift vocalization, and the Cornell Lab of Ornithology's Macaulay Library had none. It reportedly makes a "short 'pip' or 'peep'" in flight.

== Status ==
The IUCN has assessed Rothschild's swift as Near Threatened. It has a small range and an estimated population of 6000 to 15,000 mature individuals; the latter is believed to be stable. Much of the Yungas forest where it lives has been logged or converted to agriculture. It does occur in some protected areas.
