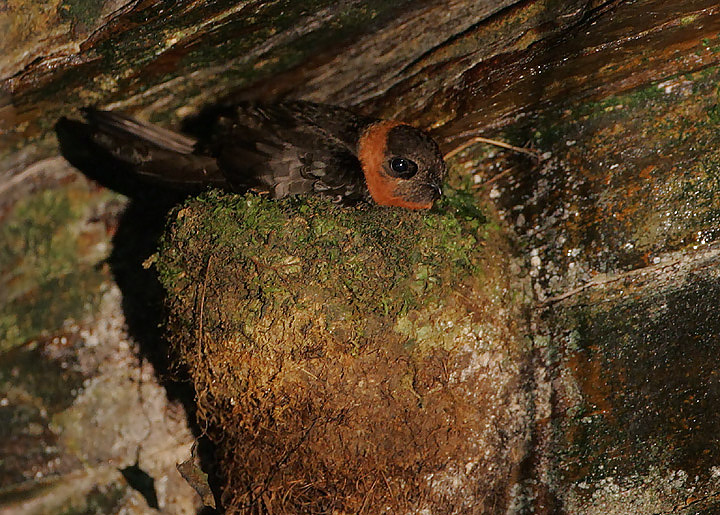
- Chestnut-collared swift (Streptoprocne rutila)

Scientific classification
- Kingdom: Animalia
- Phylum: Chordata
- Class: Aves
- Order: Apodiformes
- Family: Apodidae
- Subfamily: Cypseloidinae
- Genus: Streptoprocne; Oberholser, 1906

Type species
- Hirundo zonaris Shaw, 1796

Species
- See text

= Streptoprocne =

Genus of birds

Streptoprocne is a genus of swifts in the family Apodidae. It contains five species that exist in Central and South America.

== Species ==
- Biscutate swift (Streptoprocne biscutata)
- Tepui swift (Streptoprocne phelpsi)
- White-naped swift (Streptoprocne semicollaris)
- White-collared swift (Streptoprocne zonaris)
- Chestnut-collared swift (Streptoprocne rutila)
