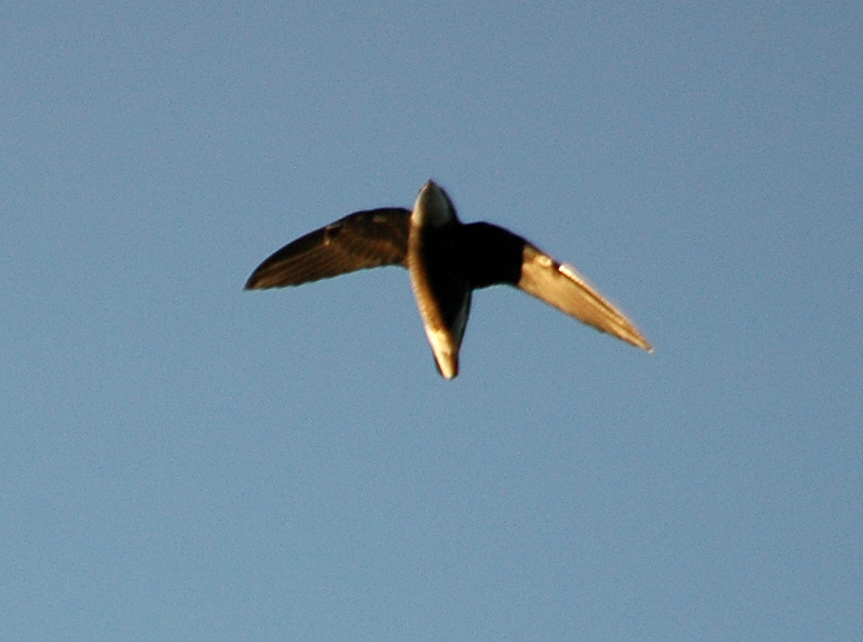
- White-throated needletail (Hirundapus caudacutus)

Scientific classification
- Kingdom: Animalia
- Phylum: Chordata
- Class: Aves
- Order: Apodiformes
- Family: Apodidae
- Tribe: Chaeturini
- Genus: Hirundapus; Hodgson, 1837

Type species
- Cypselus nudipes Hodgson, 1837

= Hirundapus =

Genus of birds

Hirundapus is a genus of swifts in the family Apodidae. The name Hirundapus is constructed from the names of the swallow genus Hirundo and the swift genus Apus.

It contains the following species:

- White-throated needletail (Hirundapus caudacutus)
- Purple needletail (Hirundapus celebensis)
- Silver-backed needletail (Hirundapus cochinchinensis)
- Brown-backed needletail (Hirundapus giganteus)
