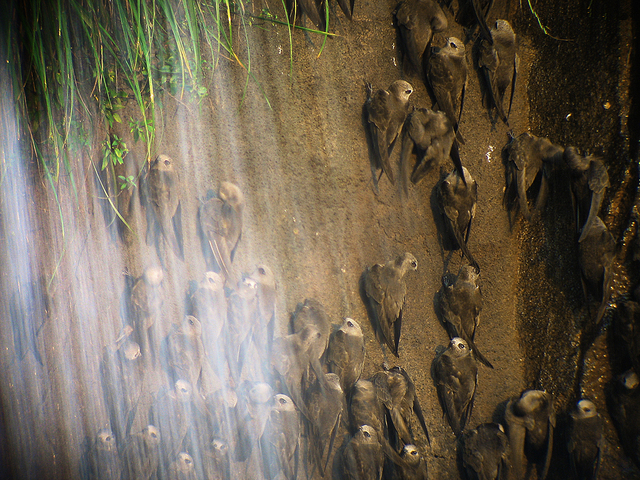
- Great dusky swift (Cypseloides senex)

Scientific classification
- Kingdom: Animalia
- Phylum: Chordata
- Class: Aves
- Clade: Strisores
- Order: Apodiformes
- Family: Apodidae
- Subfamily: Cypseloidinae
- Genus: Cypseloides; Streubel, 1848

Type species
- Hemiprocne fumigata (sooty swift) Streubel, 1848

Species
- See article

= Cypseloides =

Genus of birds

Cypseloides is a genus of swifts in the family Apodidae. It contains eight described species. They occur mainly in Central and South America. The exception being the American black swift, which has a wide range into North America.

== Taxonomy ==
The genus Cypseloides was introduced in 1848 by the German naturist August Vollrath Streubel. The type species was subsequently designated by Philip Sclater in 1866 as the sooty swift. The name combines the genus Cypselus introduced by Johann Illiger in 1811 and the Ancient Greek -oidēs meaning "resembling".

The genus contains eight species:

- Spot-fronted swift (Cypseloides cherriei)
- White-chinned swift (Cypseloides cryptus)
- Sooty swift (Cypseloides fumigatus)
- White-chested swift (Cypseloides lemosi)
- Rothschild's swift (Cypseloides rothschildi)
- Great dusky swift (Cypseloides senex)
- White-fronted swift (Cypseloides storeri)
- American black swift (Cypseloides niger)
