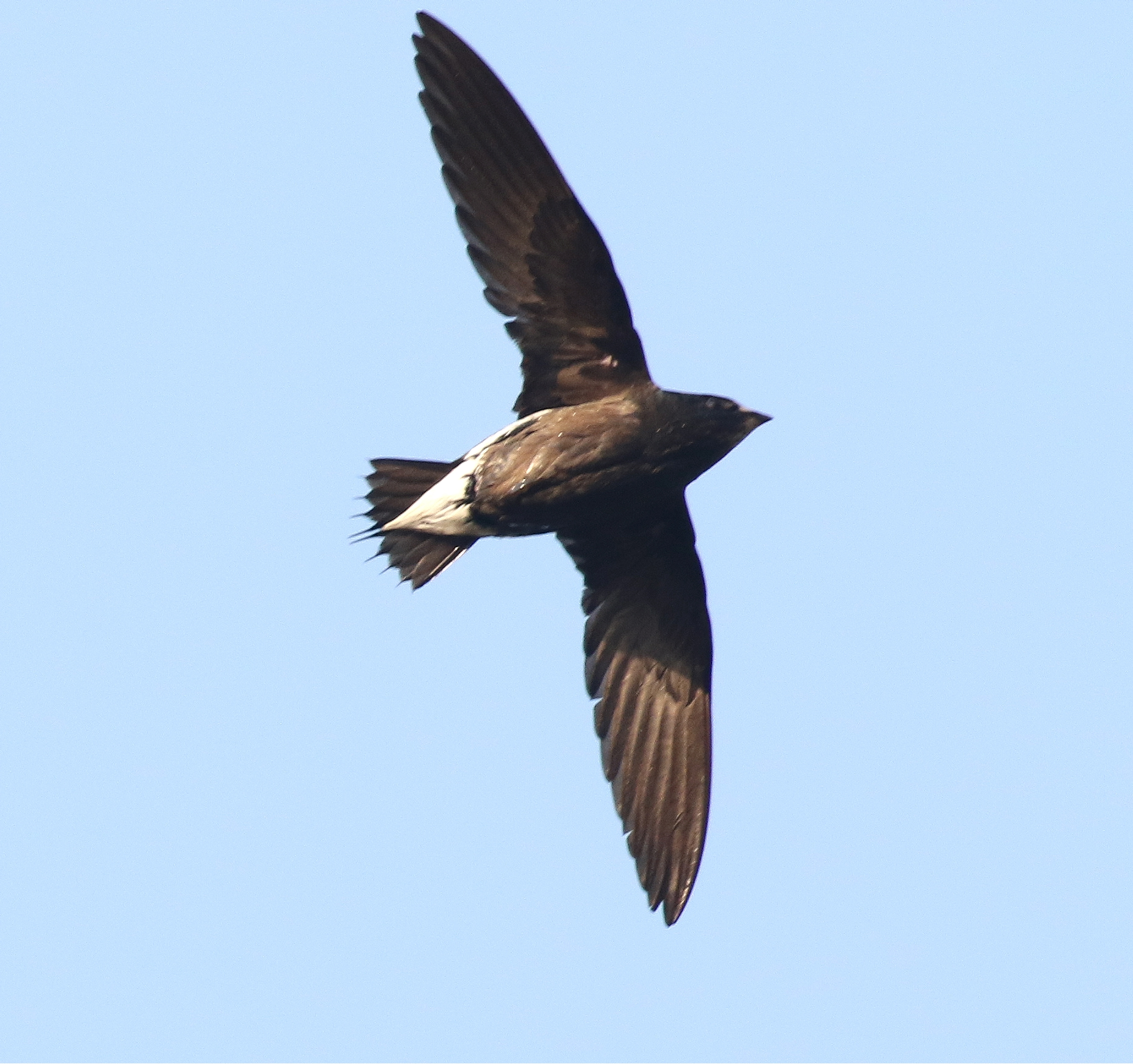

Conservation status
- Least Concern (IUCN 3.1)

Scientific classification
- Kingdom: Animalia
- Phylum: Chordata
- Class: Aves
- Order: Apodiformes
- Family: Apodidae
- Genus: Hirundapus
- Species: H. giganteus

Binomial name
- Hirundapus giganteus (Temminck, 1825)

Synonyms
- Chaetura gigantea; Cypselus giganteus; Acanthylis gigantea

= Brown-backed needletail =

brown-backed needle tail

Species of bird

The brown-backed needletail (Hirundapus giganteus), or brown needletail, is a large swift.

These birds have very short legs which they use only mainly for clinging to vertical surfaces. They never settle voluntarily on the ground and spend most of their lives in the air, living on the insects they catch in their beaks.

These swifts are resident breeders in hill forests in southern India and southeast Asia, extending to the Greater Sunda islands of Indonesia and Palawan in the southern Philippines.

They build their nests in rock crevices in cliffs, laying 3-5 eggs. The flight is impressively fast, even compared to other swifts.

The brown-backed needletail is among the largest swifts worldwide, and at 23 cm is bigger than the Alpine swift and the white-throated needletail. It has a similar build to the latter species, with a heavy barrel-like body. They are dark brown except for a white undertail, which extends on to the flanks. There are two subspecies, with the subspecies breeding in southern India (Brown-throated Needletail, H. g. indicus) distinguished from the nominate form, breeding in southeast Asia (H. g. giganteus) by white lores on the former.

The Hirundapus needletailed swifts get their name from the spined ends of their tail, which is not forked as in the Apus typical swifts. The brown-backed needletail has more prominent tail spines than in other needletail species.
