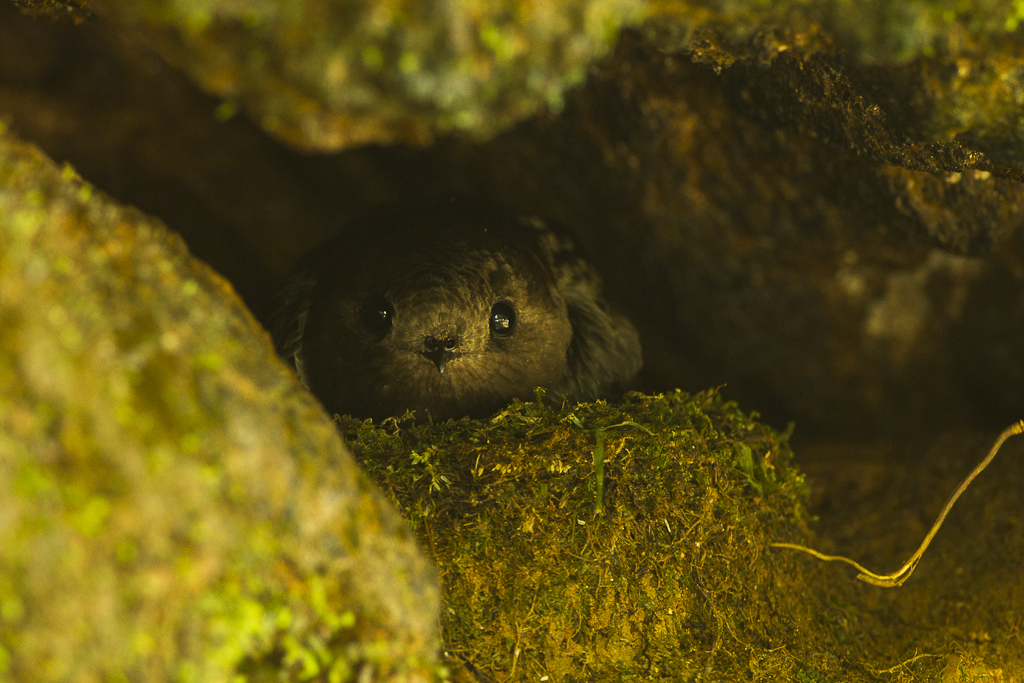

Conservation status
- Least Concern (IUCN 3.1)

Scientific classification
- Kingdom: Animalia
- Phylum: Chordata
- Class: Aves
- Order: Apodiformes
- Family: Apodidae
- Genus: Cypseloides
- Species: C. fumigatus

Binomial name
- Cypseloides fumigatus (Streubel, 1848)

= Sooty swift =

Species of bird

The sooty swift (Cypseloides fumigatus) is a species of bird in subfamily Cypseloidinae of the swift family Apodidae. It is found in Argentina, Brazil, and Paraguay.

== Taxonomy and systematics ==
The sooty swift, Rothschild's swift (Cypseloides rothschildi), white-chested swift, (C. lemosi), and American black swift (C. niger) form a superspecies. Some authors have treated sooty and Rothschild's swifts as conspecific. The sooty swift is monotypic.

== Description ==
The sooty swift is about 15 cm (5.9 in) long. Males weigh about 42 g (1.5 oz) and females about 41 g (1.4 oz). The sexes have the same plumage. Adults have a brown head, a black patch around the eye, and lighter brown forehead and cheeks. Their back is a darker brown than the head. The upper side of their tail is brown and the underside a grayer brown. The upper side of the wing is mostly blackish brown and the underside somewhat lighter. Juveniles have some gray fringing on the body and wings but are otherwise like adults.

== Distribution and habitat ==
The sooty swift is found from southern Minas Gerais in southeastern Brazil south to Rio Grande do Sul, eastern Paraguay, and northern Argentina's Misiones Province. There are no records in Bolivia despite its being included there in some taxonomic lists. The sooty swift has mostly been recorded over evergreen montane, tropical, and temperate forests, and also secondary forest, scrublands, and marshes. In elevation it is found between 700 and 2,100 m (2,300 and 6,900 ft).

== Behavior ==
=== Migration ===
The sooty swift is apparently a year-round resident throughout its range.

=== Feeding ===
Like all swifts, the sooty is an aerial insectivore, but no details of its diet are known.

=== Breeding ===
The sooty swift's breeding season varies somewhat across its range, but is between October and February overall. It makes a cup or crescent shaped nest of moss, ferns, leaves, pebbles, and mud on a rock face. Most nests are on cliff ledges but some are on the vertical face itself. Most are very near waterfalls and even behind them. It lays a single egg. The incubation period and time to fledging are not known.

=== Vocalization ===
The sooty swift's flight calls have been described as "a rapid, rattling ti-i-i-i-a-a-a, as well as tiju-tiju and a weak sip or sip-sip."

== Status ==
The IUCN has assessed the sooty swift as being of Least Concern. it has a large range but its population size is not known and believed to be decreasing. No immediate threats have been identified.
