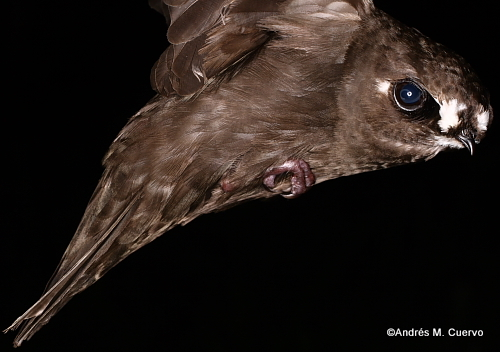

Conservation status
- Least Concern (IUCN 3.1)

Scientific classification
- Kingdom: Animalia
- Phylum: Chordata
- Class: Aves
- Order: Apodiformes
- Family: Apodidae
- Genus: Cypseloides
- Species: C. cherriei

Binomial name
- Cypseloides cherriei Ridgway, 1893

= Spot-fronted swift =

Species of bird

The spot-fronted swift (Cypseloides cherriei) is a species of bird in subfamily Cypseloidinae of the swift family Apodidae. It is found in Colombia, Costa Rica, Ecuador, Panama, Peru, and Venezuela.

== Taxonomy and systematics ==
The spot-fronted swift is monotypic.

== Description ==
The spot-fronted swift is about 14 cm (5.5 in) long and weighs about 23 g (0.81 oz). The sexes are alike. They are almost entirely blackish brown with grayish underwings and a white chin. They get their English name from bright white spots on either side of the bill and behind the eyes.

== Distribution and habitat ==
The spot-fronted swift has a scattered distribution. In Costa Rica it is mostly found on the Pacific slope of the Cordillera Central and Cordillera de Talamanca. It is known in Panama from only a few locations and in Colombia and Ecuador from a larger number, though still widely separated. It is almost unknown in far western Venezuela and extreme northern Peru. It mostly inhabits montane forest at elevations between 1,100 and 2,200 m (3,600 and 7,200 ft) but has been documented at 300 m (980 ft) in Ecuador.

== Behavior ==
=== Migration ===
It is not known whether the spot-fronted swift is resident or migratory. There is some evidence of elevational movements, but they could be either migration or daily foraging flights.

=== Feeding ===
Like all swifts, the spot-fronted is an aerial insectivore. In one study nearly all of its prey were Hemiptera (true bugs) and Hymenoptera (bees, wasps, and ants). Flocks of up to about 50 may forage together, sometimes with other swifts.

=== Breeding ===
The spot-fronted swift's nesting season overall includes at least April to July but varies geographically. It makes a cup nest of moss, ferns, and mud on a vertical rock face near or even directly above water. It lays a single egg. In a Costa Rica study the incubation period was 26 to 28 days and fledging occurred 65 to 70 days after hatch.

=== Vocalization ===
The spot-fronted swift's flight call has been compared to the sound of laser gun and transliterated as "chirr chi-t-t-ti chirr".

== Status ==
The IUCN has assessed the spot-fronted swift a Data Deficient because "there is no information on the true extent of its distribution, population size or trends." However, the population is thought to be stable.
