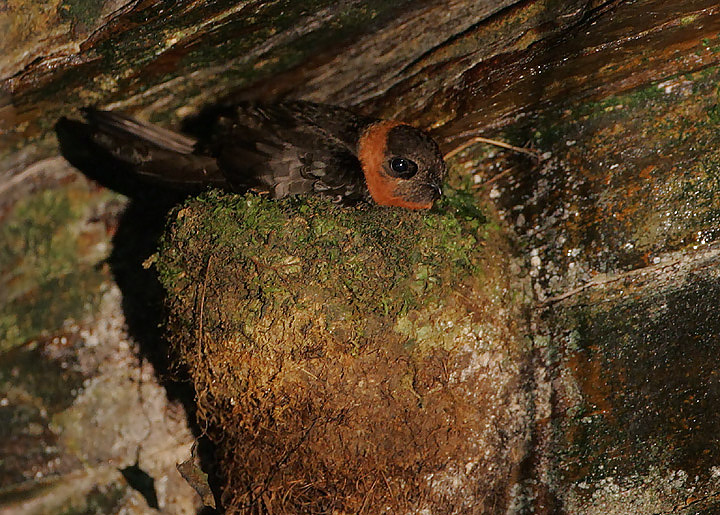
- An adult male on the nest.

Conservation status
- Least Concern (IUCN 3.1)

Scientific classification
- Kingdom: Animalia
- Phylum: Chordata
- Class: Aves
- Clade: Strisores
- Order: Apodiformes
- Family: Apodidae
- Genus: Streptoprocne
- Species: S. rutila

Binomial name
- Streptoprocne rutila (Vieillot, 1817)
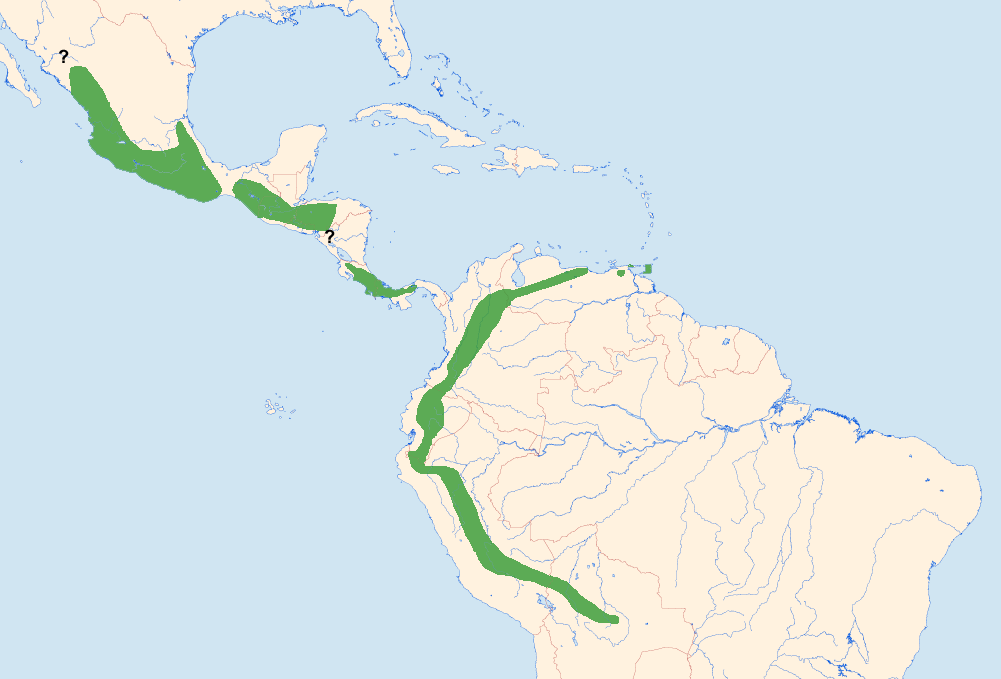
- Range of Streptoprocne rutila

Synonyms
- Cypseloides rutilus; Chaetura rutila

= Chestnut-collared swift =

Species of bird

The chestnut-collared swift (Streptoprocne rutila) is a species of bird in subfamily Cypseloidinae of the swift family Apodidae. It is found from Mexico and Trinidad south to Peru and Bolivia.

== Taxonomy and systematics ==
The chestnut-collared swift has at various times been placed in genera Cypseloides and Chaetura. These three subspecies are recognized:

- S. r. griseifrons (Nelson, 1900)
- S. r. brunnitorques (Lafresnaye, 1844)
- S. r. rutila (Vieillot, 1817)

Subspecies S. r. brunnitorques has been treated as a separate species, but it is now (2020) suspected of not being even a separate subspecies, as "no clear diagnosis of distinctions between brunnitorques and rutila has been published."

== Description ==
The chesnut-collared swift is one of the smaller members of genus Streptoprocne. It is 12 to 14 cm (4.7 to 5.5 in) long and weighs about 21 g (0.74 oz). It has a wide slightly notched tail and broad wings. Adult males of the nominate subspecies S. r. rutila have a sooty blackish brown crown, a blackish brown back, slightly paler rump and uppertail coverts, and a sooty blackish brown tail. They have a narrow black patch around the eye and grayish brown cheeks, chin, and throat with some dull rufous feathers mixed in. They have a wide rufous collar across the lower throat and upper breast that extends around to the nape. The upper side of their wing is shades of black and the underside slightly lighter. Their underparts are a paler blackish brown than the upperparts. Adult females have paler body plumage than males and have a much smaller rufous collar or none at all. Juveniles resemble adult females but are paler overall.

Subspecies S. r. griseifrons has sooty gray rather than almost black upperparts, sooty grayish brown underparts, and pale gray fringes on most facial feathers. Subspecies S. r. brunnitorques is essentially indistinguishable from the nominate.

== Distribution and habitat ==
The subspecies of chestnut-collared swift are distributed thus:

- S. r. griseifrons, western Mexico from Sinaloa, Durango and Zacatecas south to Oaxaca
- S. r. brunnitorques, southeastern Mexico through Central America and along the Andes of Colombia, Ecuador, Bolivia, and Peru
- S. r. rutila, Andes and Coastal Ranges of Venezuela; Trinidad

The exact extent of each range is imperfectly known. Some specimens attributed to S. r. griseifrons have been collected in Venezuela and much further south, though few taxonomists agree with those identifications. Other taxonomists extend the range of S. r. brunnitorques into Venezuela, an area which most assign to S. r. rutila, and some have proposed that brunnitorques should be merged into rutila.

The chestnut-collared swift inhabits a variety of landscapes including humid montane and pine-oak forests, semi-deciduous forest, evergreen forest, semi-open areas, and small human communities. In elevation it ranges from a few hundred meters above sea level to as high as 3,000 m (9,800 ft) in Mexico and northern Central America, 2,500 m (8,200 ft) in Costa Rica and Colombia, 2,700 m (8,900 ft) in Ecuador, and 3,100 m (10,200 ft) in Bolivia.

== Behavior ==
=== Movement ===
The chestnut-collared swift is a year-round resident throughout its range, though it apparently makes some local seasonal movements.

=== Feeding ===
Like all swifts, the chestnut-collared is an aerial insectivore. Details of its diet are lacking but it is known to feed on several families of insects. Some studies have shown a preference for flying ants and others for small beetles; their results may represent local or temporal availability. It often forages in flocks of 10 to 20 birds and sometimes much higher numbers. It sometimes forages with other swift species and tends to stay near the top of such mixed-species flocks.

=== Breeding ===
The chestnut-collared swift's breeding season varies with latitude but generally is within May to August north of the equator; the season at and below the equator has not been determined. It builds a nest of mud and plant material such as moss, liverwort, and fern on small ledge or niche of a rock wall in a damp shady location near water, such as in a cave, under a bridge, or in a culvert. The clutch size is two eggs. Both parents incubate the eggs for 22 to 23 days and fledging occurs at five to six weeks after hatch.

=== Vocalization ===
One description of the chesnut-collared swift's flight call is "buzzy...like electric crackles or static, occasionally strung into a chatter: bzzzz'tzz'tzz'tzz zz zzzz zzzzz zzzz."

== Status ==
The IUCN has assessed the chestnut-collared swift as being of Least Concern. It has a very large range and an estimated population of at least 50,000 mature individuals, though the latter is believed to be decreasing. No immediate threats have been identified. "Human activity probably has little effect on Chestnut-collared Swift".
