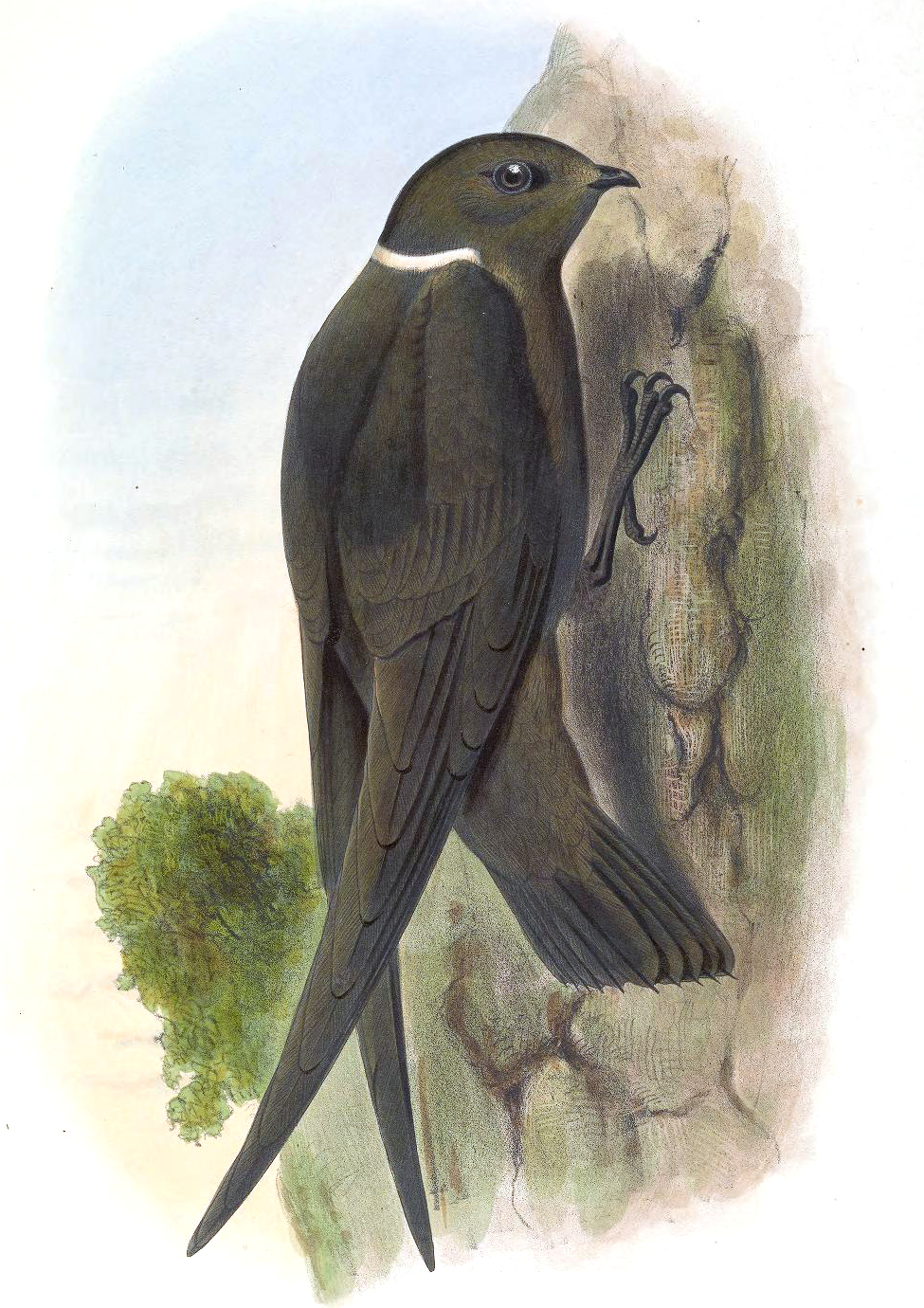

Conservation status
- Least Concern (IUCN 3.1)

Scientific classification
- Kingdom: Animalia
- Phylum: Chordata
- Class: Aves
- Clade: Strisores
- Order: Apodiformes
- Family: Apodidae
- Genus: Streptoprocne
- Species: S. semicollaris

Binomial name
- Streptoprocne semicollaris (de Saussure, HLF, 1859)

= White-naped swift =

Species of bird

The white-naped swift (Streptoprocne semicollaris) is the largest representative of the swift family in the New World and one of the two largest species in the world. Only the purple needletail of Asia may be slightly larger. This bird is found principally in western and central Mexico, with one record on the Guatemalan border.

This species is essentially a bird of wild highland landscapes, where it favors cliff faces, deep river gorges and high crags. Its main habitats are pine-oak forests, tropical deciduous forests and second-growth scrub. This swift is usually found at an elevation of 1,500 to 3,000 m (4,900 to 9,800 ft) and, much more rarely, down to sea level.

The white-naped swift is huge for a swift, measuring 20.5–25 cm (8.1–9.8 in) long, being some 20% larger than its more common and much more widespread cousin, the white-collared swift. Weight in the species can vary from 115 to 225 g (4.1 to 7.9 oz) with a reported average weight of 175 g (6.2 oz). The adults are brown-black, glossed blue on the back, and have a white crescent on the nape. The tail is fairly squared off, but can be held in a minorly notched way when flying. The more widespread white-collared swift is similar, sometimes measuring nearly as large. The white-collar, however, has a complete white collar (whereas the White-nape has no white on the underside) and has a strongly notched tail.

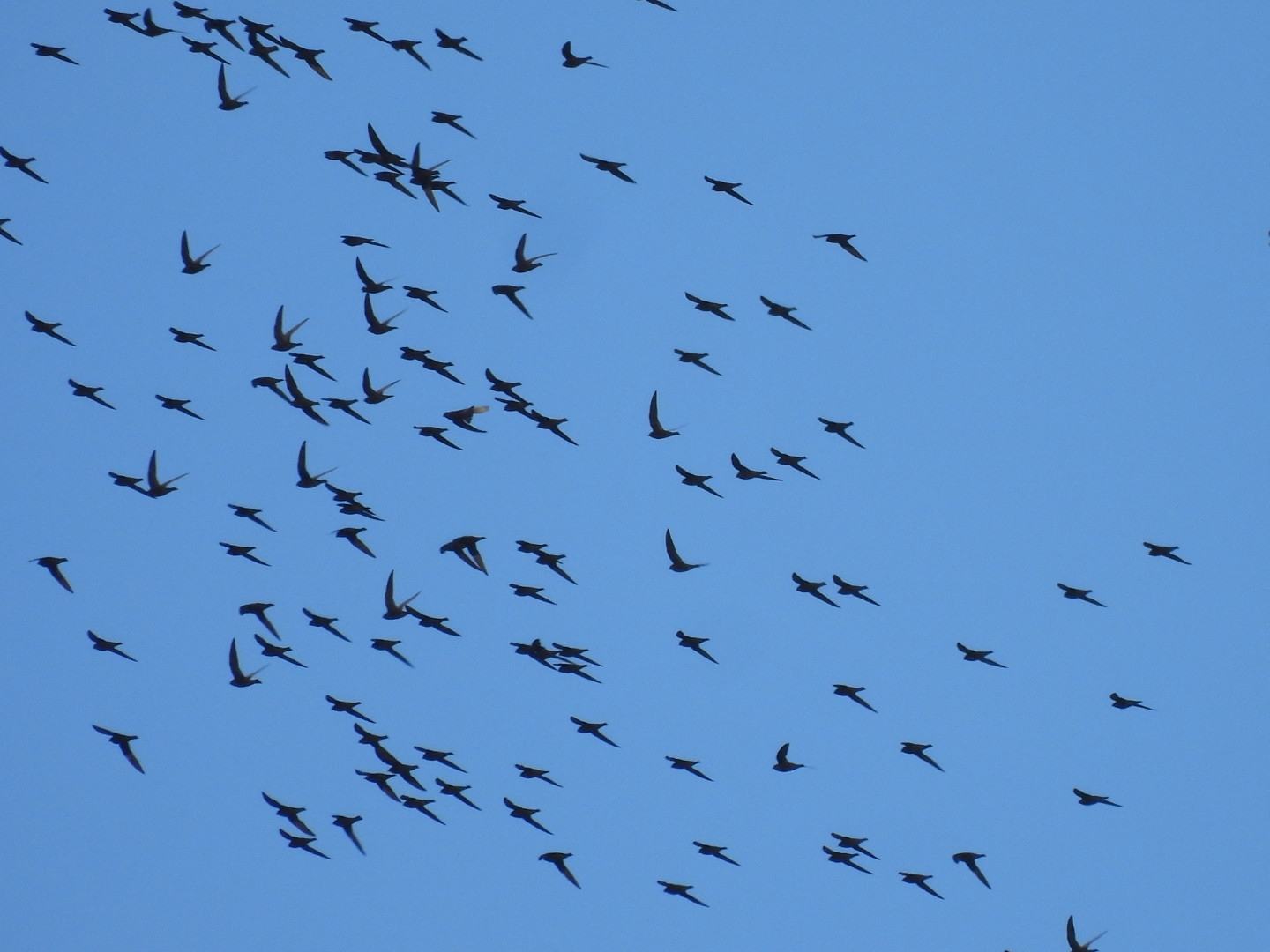
Flock

This is a gregarious species, with breeding colonies sometimes including up to 200 individuals. It has been observed roosting alongside several other species of swift as well. Breeding colonies often forage together to several miles away from the breeding site. It has a powerful, fast and direct flight, and will ascent thermals to great heights. White-naped swifts feeds in flight on a variety of flying insects, including beetles, bees and flying ants.

The nest is typically a shallow depression (made by the parents) in dry sand, usually lacking any materials or saliva, although they are apparently picky about the consistency of the soil used. The nests have usually been found in caves, with the nest located on ledges off the main chamber. Two white eggs are laid. The details of brooding behavior are not known.

This swift is normally silent when seen solitary and noisy when encountered in a group. The call is described as cree-cree-cree. The call is delivered both while in flight and while perched on the walls of the nesting cave.
