= Box Canyon (Colorado) =

Coordinates: 38°01′06″N 107°40′44″W

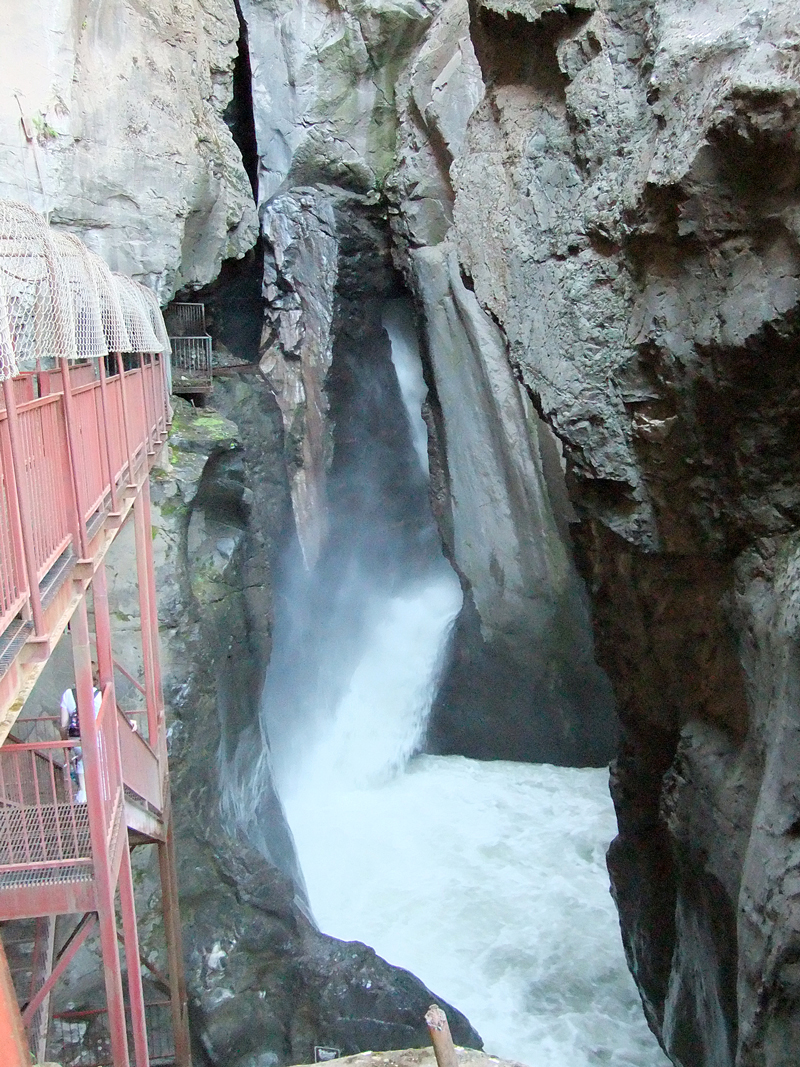
Box Canyon Falls, September 2012

Box Canyon is a box canyon in Ouray County, Colorado, United States.

== Description ==
A mining camp was established in the canyon that helped the city of Ouray establish itself as a permanent community. Box Canyon is home to Box Canyon Falls, a 285 feet (87 m) waterfall, with quartzite walls that extend almost 100 ft (30 m) past the falls. Access to the canyon is through a short, 500 feet (150 m) foot trail to the base of the falls or a steep trail leading to the top of the falls. A fee is required to use the trails to the canyon.

== Geology ==
Box Canyon contains an angular unconformity. The Elbert Formation sits on the Uncompahgre Formation which represents a geologic age difference of approximately 1.3 billion years.
