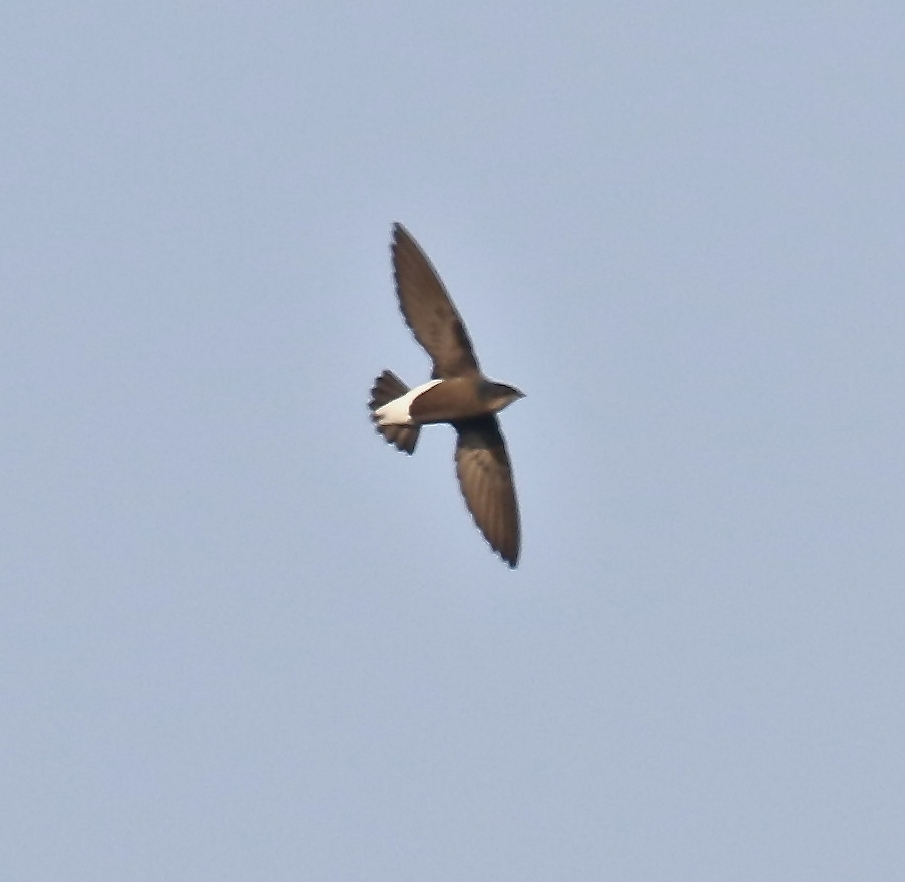

Conservation status
- Least Concern (IUCN 3.1)

Scientific classification
- Kingdom: Animalia
- Phylum: Chordata
- Class: Aves
- Order: Apodiformes
- Family: Apodidae
- Genus: Hirundapus
- Species: H. cochinchinensis

Binomial name
- Hirundapus cochinchinensis (Oustalet, 1878)

= Silver-backed needletail =

Species of bird

The silver-backed needletail (Hirundapus cochinchinensis) is a species of swift in the family Apodidae. It is found in Southeast Asia, Sumatra, Java and Taiwan. It is a vagrant to Christmas Island. Its natural habitat is subtropical or tropical moist lowland forests.
