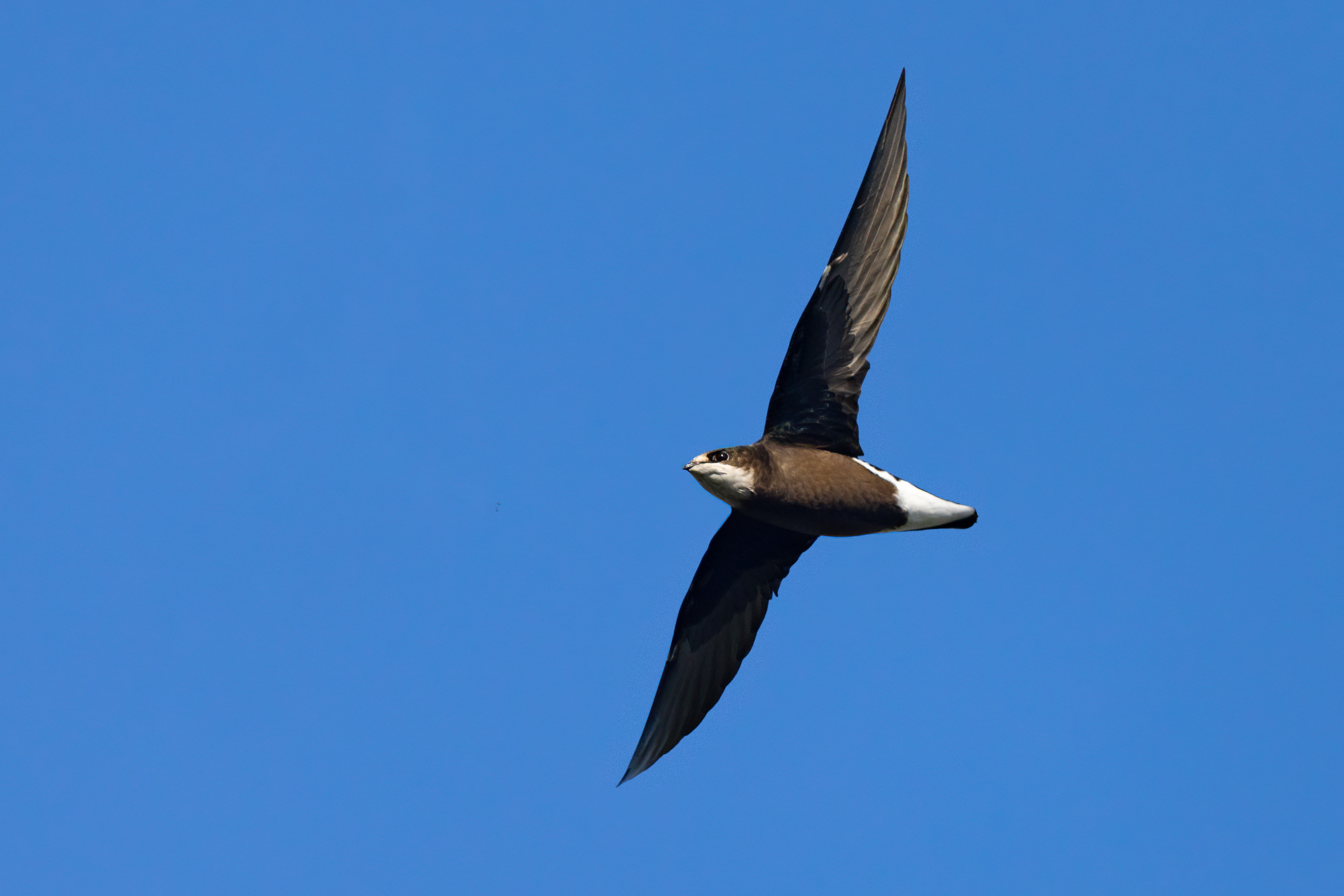

Conservation status
- Least Concern (IUCN 3.1)

Scientific classification
- Kingdom: Animalia
- Phylum: Chordata
- Class: Aves
- Order: Apodiformes
- Family: Apodidae
- Genus: Hirundapus
- Species: H. caudacutus

Binomial name
- Hirundapus caudacutus (Latham, 1801)
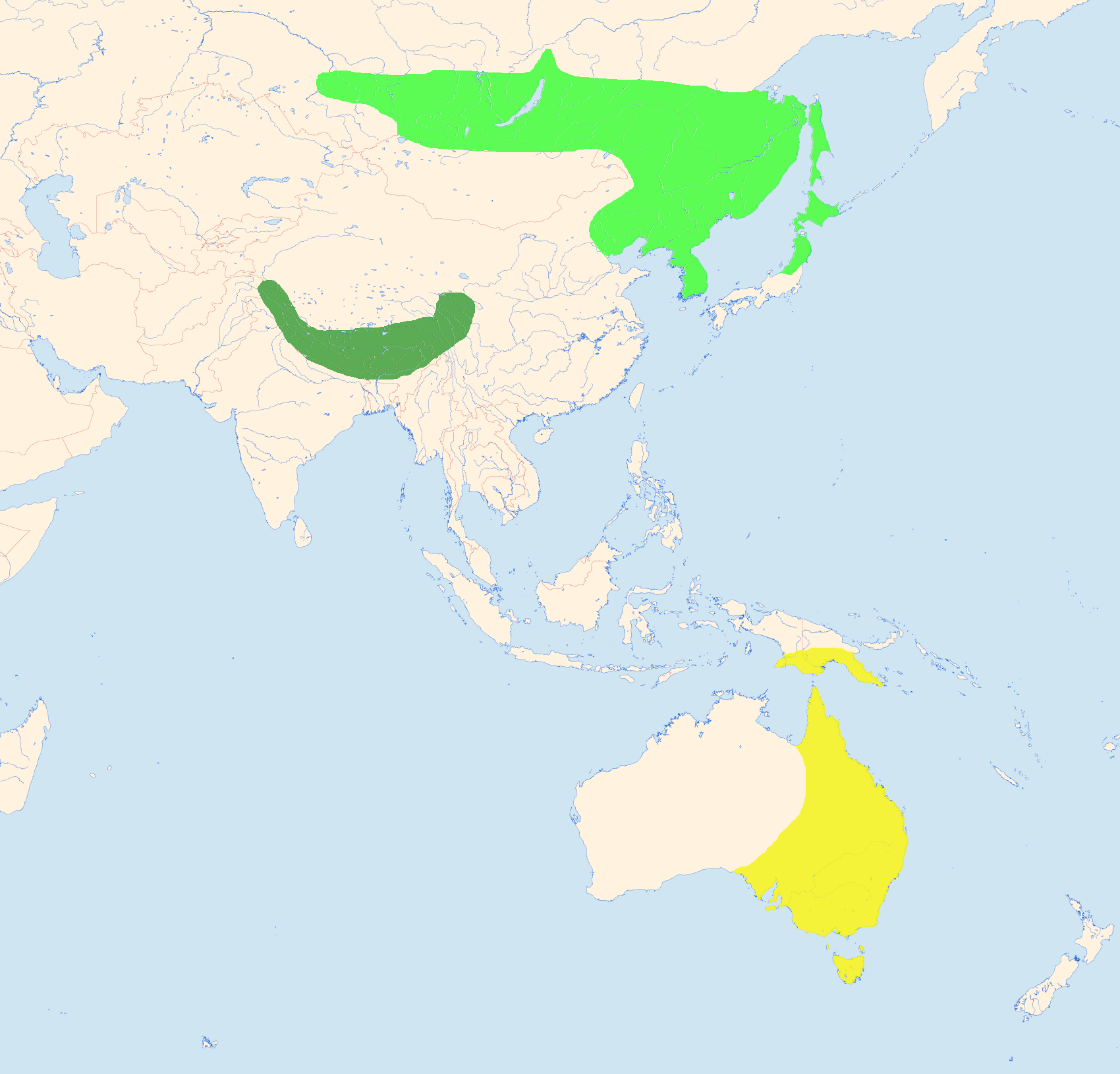
- Northern summer Resident Northern winter

Synonyms
- Acanthylis caudacuta

= White-throated needletail =

Species of bird

The white-throated needletail (Hirundapus caudacutus), also known as the needle-tailed swift or spine-tailed swift, is a large swift in the genus Hirundapus. It is reputed to reach speeds of up to 170 km/h (110 mph) in horizontal flight, but this is unverified because the methods used to measure its speed have not been published. 75 km/h (47 mph) is more likely, but this is still at least 100 times the bird's length per second.

They build their nests in rock crevices in cliffs or hollow trees. They do not like to sit on the ground and spend most of their time in the air. They feed on small, flying insects like beetles, flies, bees and moths.

The white-throated needletail is a migratory bird, breeding in Central Asia and southern Siberia, and wintering south in the Indian subcontinent, Southeast Asia and Australia. It is a rare vagrant in Western Europe and has been recorded as far west as Norway, Sweden and Great Britain. In June 2013, an individual was spotted in Great Britain for the first time in 22 years. It later flew into a wind turbine and died; its body was sent to a museum.

In June 2022, a bird was recovered on an expedition ship MV Ortelius near Fair Isle approx 70 miles off Duncansby Head, Caithness, Scotland and successfully released.

In October 2025, a white-throated needletail was spotted at Tophill Low Nature Reserve in East Yorkshire, England.

White-throated needletails are large swifts with a robust, barrel-like body. They measure about 20 cm (7.9 in) and weigh between 110 and 120 grams (3.9 and 4.2 oz). They are greyish-brown except for a white throat and a white patch, extending from the base of the tail to the flanks.

Needle-tailed swifts get their name from the spined end of their tail, which is not forked as it is in the typical swifts of the genus Apus.

The white-throated needletail was first described by the English ornithologist John Latham in 1801 under the binomial name Hirundo caudacuta. Their current genus Hirundapus is constructed from the names of the swallow genus Hirundo and the swift genus Apus. The specific name caudacutus comes from the Latin words cauda meaning "tail" and acutus meaning "pointed".

== See also ==
- List of birds by flight speed
