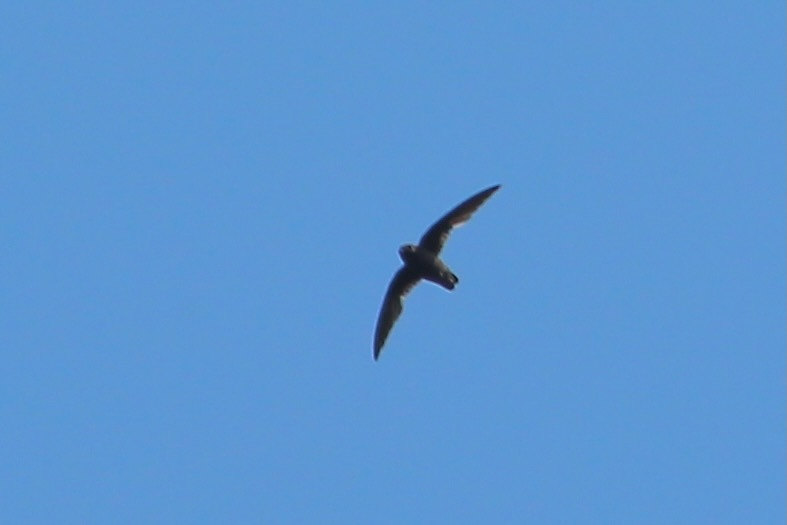

Conservation status
- Data Deficient (IUCN 3.1)

Scientific classification
- Kingdom: Animalia
- Phylum: Chordata
- Class: Aves
- Clade: Strisores
- Order: Apodiformes
- Family: Apodidae
- Genus: Cypseloides
- Species: C. storeri

Binomial name
- Cypseloides storeri Navarro, A.T. Peterson, Escalante & D. Benitez, 1992

= White-fronted swift =

Species of bird

The white-fronted swift (Cypseloides storeri) is a species of swift in the family Apodidae. It is endemic to Mexico. Its natural habitat is subtropical or tropical moist montane forests.
