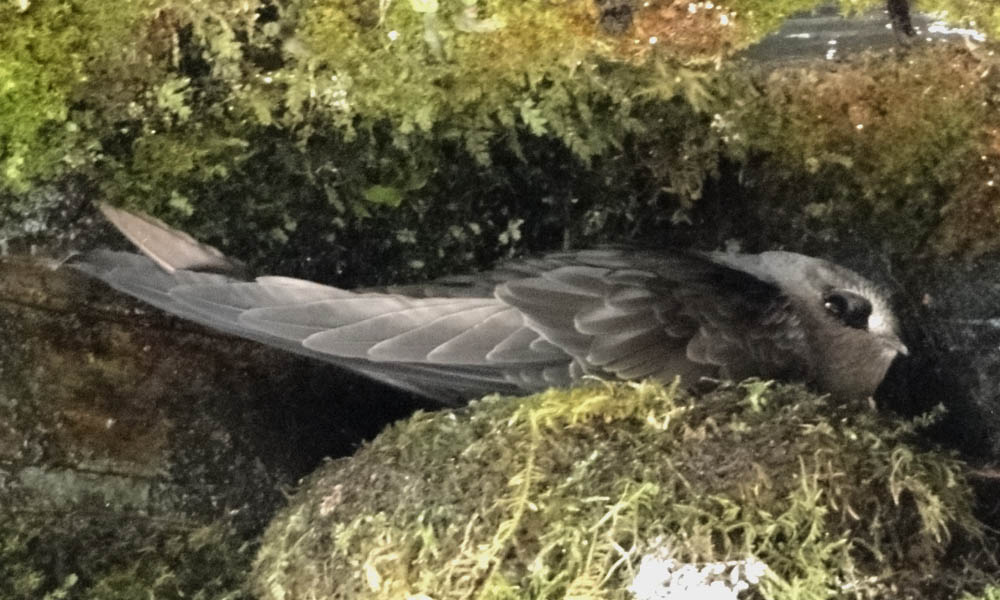
- An adult on its nest in Shoshone County, Idaho

Conservation status
- Vulnerable (IUCN 3.1)

Scientific classification
- Kingdom: Animalia
- Phylum: Chordata
- Class: Aves
- Order: Apodiformes
- Family: Apodidae
- Genus: Cypseloides
- Species: C. niger

Binomial name
- Cypseloides niger (Gmelin, JF, 1789)
- Range breeding visitor passage and vagrancy present year-round (movements in South America are poorly known)

= American black swift =

Species of bird

The American black swift, or more simply black swift (Cypseloides niger), is a species of bird that is found from northern British Columbia in Canada through the United States and Mexico to Costa Rica and Brazil. They are also found in the Caribbean.

== Taxonomy ==
The American black swift was formally described in 1789 by the German naturalist Johann Friedrich Gmelin in his revised and expanded edition of Carl Linnaeus's Systema Naturae. He placed it with all the other swallows and swifts in the genus Hirundo and coined the binomial name Hirundo nigra. Gmelin based his description on that of French zoologist Mathurin Jacques Brisson who, in 1760, had described and illustrated "Le Martinet de Saint Dominigue" from a preserved specimen. The type locality is Hispaniola: Saint-Domingue was a French colony on the Caribbean island. The American black swift is now placed with seven other swifts in the genus Cypseloides and was introduced in 1848 by the German naturist August Vollrath Streubel. The genus name combines the genus Cypselus introduced by Johann Illiger in 1811 and the Ancient Greek -oidēs meaning "resembling". The specific epithet niger is the Latin word for "black".

Three subspecies are recognised:

- C. n. borealis (Kennerly, 1858) – southeast Alaska to southwest USA
- C. n. costaricensis Ridgway, 1910 – central Mexico to Costa Rica
- C. n. niger (Gmelin, JF, 1789) – West Indies and Trinidad

== Description ==
In flight, these birds resemble flying cigars with long slender curved wings. The plumage is mostly a sooty, dark gray. There is some contrast between the inner and outer portions of the wing. The shoulders are distinctly darker in color than other parts of the wing. They have short tails that are slightly forked.

== Distribution and habitat ==
Fewer than 150 black swift breeding sites are known in the United States and Canada, with 108 (as of July 2012) known from Colorado. These include:

- In Alberta: next to a waterfall in Johnston Canyon, Banff National Park (declining, given extra protection as of August 2018); Maligne Canyon, Jasper National Park
- In California: the Santa Cruz coast (where it is declining); Berry Creek Falls; Burney Falls State Park; Yosemite, Sequoia, and Kings Canyon National Parks; the San Bernardino Mountains; and the San Jacinto Mountains
- In Colorado: Box Canyon near Ouray, Hanging Lake, Hawk Creek Falls, Falls Creek Falls, and Niagara and Cataract Gulches
- In New Mexico: Jemez Falls
- In Utah: Stewart Falls
- In Washington: Semiahmoo Bay

These birds migrate out of North America after the breeding season. It remains unclear where most of the birds spend the winter, although some of the birds have been tracked as far south as Brazil. A study published in 2012 tagged four birds breeding in Colorado with a light-level geolocator and found that the birds wintered in the lowland rainforest of western Brazil. Some of the birds in the West Indies appear to be permanent residents. They are late spring migrants into the breeding range, with Colorado breeders not arriving until the very end of May into June. Large flocks of migrants are occasionally seen in spring and fall, but only very rarely far south of the U.S. breeding range.

== Behavior and ecology ==
=== Food and feeding ===
American black swifts live on the wing, foraging in flight. They eat flying insects, primarily flying ants and beetles, often foraging in small groups.

=== Breeding ===
Their breeding habitat is frequently associated with water. The birds most often nest on high cliff faces, either above the ocean surf or behind or next to waterfalls. The nest is made of twigs and moss glued together with mud. They will also use ferns and seaweed if available. The clutch size is one egg, with incubation lasting 23–27 days. Newly hatched young are probably fed multiple times a day, but older nestlings usually only once a day by each parent, most often at dusk. Adults spend the night roosting at or near the nest site.
