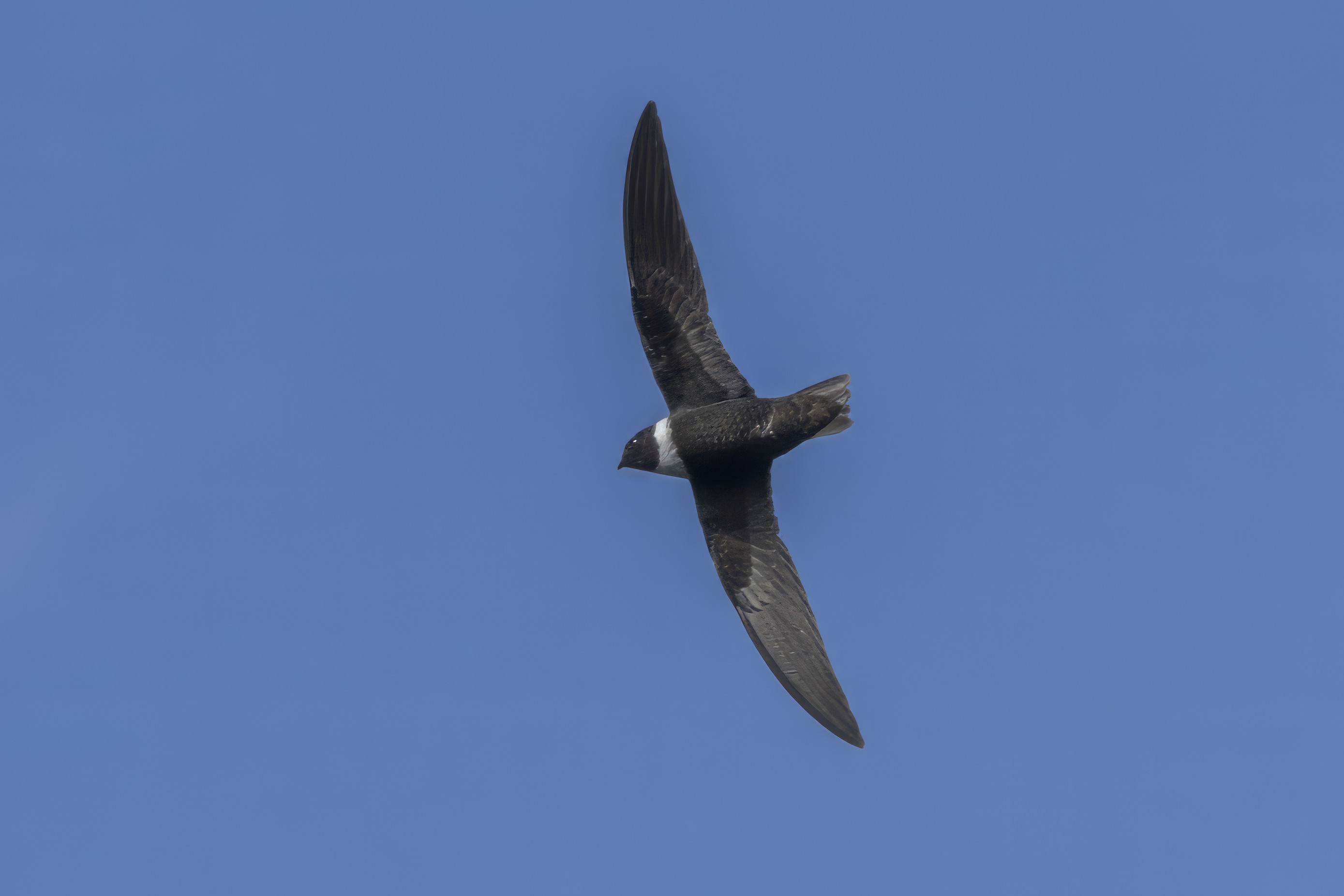
- Streptoprocne zonaris altissima Los Nevados, Colombia

Conservation status
- Least Concern (IUCN 3.1)

Scientific classification
- Kingdom: Animalia
- Phylum: Chordata
- Class: Aves
- Order: Apodiformes
- Family: Apodidae
- Genus: Streptoprocne
- Species: S. zonaris

Binomial name
- Streptoprocne zonaris (Shaw, 1796)

= White-collared swift =

Species of bird

The white-collared swift (Streptoprocne zonaris) is a species of bird in the subfamily Cypseloidinae of the swift family Apodidae. It is found in Mexico, Central America, the Greater and Lesser Antilles, Trinidad, and every mainland South American country.

== Taxonomy and systematics ==
The white-collared swift has these nine recognized subspecies:

- S. z. mexicana Ridgway, 1910
- S. z. bouchellii Huber, 1923
- S. z. pallidifrons (Hartert, 1896)
- S. z. minor (Lawrence, 1882)
- S. z. albicincta (Cabanis, 1862)
- S. z. subtropicalis Parkes, 1994
- S. z. altissima Chapman, 1914
- S. z. kuenzeli Niethammer, 1953
- S. z. zonaris (Shaw, 1796)

== Description ==
The white-collared swift is the largest species of swift in its range except in northwestern Mexico, where it and the slightly larger white-naped swift (S. semicollaris) are sympatric. The white-collared swift is 20 to 21.5 cm (7.9 to 8.5 in) long and weighs 90 to 125 g (3.2 to 4.4 oz). It has a wingspan of 45 to 55 cm (18 to 22 in). It has a very slightly forked tail and the sexes have the same plumage. Adults have a white collar that circles the neck and is broadest on the breast. Their forehead is sooty, most of the head dark sooty black, the tail grayish black, and the rest of the plumage black. The back, rump, and uppertail coverts have a slight blue gloss. Juveniles are duller and sootier than adults and have grayish white to white tips on most of their body feathers. There are minor differences among the subspecies in the width of the white collar, the shades of black on the body and tail, and the amount of white fringing on the juvenile.

== Distribution and habitat ==
The subspecies of the white-collared swift are found thus:

- S. z. mexicana, from Guerrero and Veracruz in southern Mexico south into Guatemala and Belize
- S. z. bouchellii, from Honduras and El Salvador through Nicaragua and Costa Rica into Panama
- S. z. pallidifrons, the Greater and Lesser Antilles
- S. z. minor, the Coastal Ranges of Venezuela; Trinidad; vagrant to Tobago
- S. z. albicincta, inland Venezuela and the Guianas
- S. z. subtropicalis, from western Venezuela in the Andes through Colombia and Ecuador into Peru
- S. z. altissima, high Andes of Colombia and Ecuador
- S. z. kuenzeli, high Andes of Argentina, Bolivia, and Chile
- S. z. zonaris, Bolivia, southern Brazil, and Paraguay; vagrant to Uruguay

The species has also been noted as a vagrant on Aruba but which subspecies is not known. Further north it has also occurred as a documented vagrant in Texas and Florida and there are sight records from California, Michigan, and several locations in northern Mexico.

The white-collared swift inhabits a large variety of landscapes. It is most common over montane and submontane evergreen forests, and is also found over lowland evergreen forests, secondary forests, and more open habitats like scrublands. In elevation, it ranges from lowlands to 3,600 m (11,800 ft).

== Predation ==
The only documented predation on white-collared swifts was by Virginia opossums, which raid and eat the young in nests, and peregrine falcons, which are known to wait near colony entrances to take birds as they enter or leave.

== Behavior ==
=== Movement ===
The white-collared swift is usually considered to be resident throughout its range. However, it has many times been documented beyond its usual northern limit and also makes significant movements to lower elevations to escape bad weather.

=== Feeding ===
Like all swifts, the white-collared is an aerial insectivore. Details of its diet are lacking, but a pair of specimens from southern Mexico had fed almost exclusively on flying ants. It often feeds in flocks of 200 or more that sometimes include other swift species. It has a powerful, fast, and direct flight, and will ascend thermals to great heights. White-collared swifts attain or exceed flying speeds of 70 to 100 km/h (43 to 62 mph).

=== Breeding ===
The white-collared swift's nesting season in southern Mexico and Costa Rica includes at least April and May; it has not been documented elsewhere. It nests in colonies within caves, which often contain a stream or are behind a waterfall. It builds its nest on a ledge or other protrusion or in a niche, sometimes behind a waterfall. Nests are flattish circles made from some or all of mud, moss, and insect chitin lined with leaves or fern fronds; the materials used can differ between colonies. In two studies they measured 120 to 170 mm (4.7 to 6.7 in) in diameter with depths of 30 to 90 mm (1.2 to 3.5 in). The clutch size is two eggs. The incubation period and time to fledging are not known; nestlings become independent 45 to 55 days after hatch.

=== Vocal and non-vocal sounds ===
The white-collared swift's vocalizations have been described as "nasal twitter of chee chee chee, whiss whiss" and "scratchy but not shrill tseet, tchee, and chirrio notes". Flock members may call in unison. A flock makes "an impressive swooshing rush of air" when rapidly descending, as down a valley.

== Status ==
The IUCN has assessed the white-collared swift as being of Least Concern. It has an extremely large range and an estimated population of at least five million mature individuals, though the population is believed to be decreasing. No immediate threats have been identified. "Populations are not known to be affected by humans."
