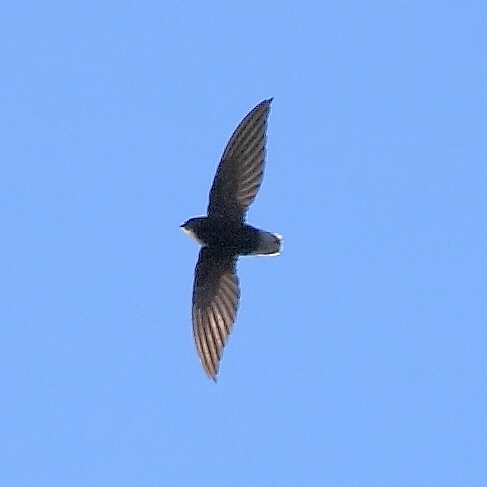
- flying over Cristalino river, Mato Grosso state, Brazil

Conservation status
- Least Concern (IUCN 3.1)

Scientific classification
- Kingdom: Animalia
- Phylum: Chordata
- Class: Aves
- Order: Apodiformes
- Family: Apodidae
- Genus: Chaetura
- Species: C. brachyura

Binomial name
- Chaetura brachyura (Jardine, 1846)

= Short-tailed swift =

Species of bird

The short-tailed swift (Chaetura brachyura) is a bird in the Apodidae, or swift family.

== Taxonomy ==
The species was first formally described as Acanthylis brachyura in 1846 by the Scottish naturalist Sir William Jardine, based on the observations of Mr. Kirk, a resident of Tobago.

The genus name Chaetura is derived from the Greek khaite (hair) and oura (tail). The specific epithet brachyura is Greek for brakhus (short) and ouros (tailed).

Four subspecies are recognized:

- C. b. praevelox, found in Grenada, Saint Vincent, and Tobago
- C. b. brachyura, the nominate subspecies, found from Panama to Trinidad and the Guianas, south to west-central Brazil and northern Bolivia
- C. b. ocypetes, found in southwest Ecuador and northwest Peru
- C. b. cinereocauda, found in north-central Brazil

The subspecies C. b. ocypetes is sometimes considered a full species, the Tumbes swift Chaetura ocypetes Zimmer, 1953.

== Distribution and habitat ==
The swift is a common resident of Trinidad, Tobago, Grenada and Saint Vincent, and in tropical South America from Panama, Colombia and the Guianas south to Ecuador, Peru and Brazil; in Brazil, the entire Amazon Basin, excluding much of the southeastern Basin. It rarely occurs over 800 m ASL even in the hottest parts of its range and in mountainous or hilly terrain it inhabits, but has been recorded as high as 1,300 m ASL. It is found in a range of habitats including savanna, open woodland, and cultivation.

== Description ==
The short-tailed swift is about 10.5 cm long, and weighs 20 g. It has long narrow wings, a robust body and a short tail. The sexes are similar. It is mainly black with a pale rump and tail. It can be distinguished from related species in its range, such as the band-rumped swift (C. spinicauda) or the gray-rumped swift (C. cinereiventris) by the lack of contrast between the rump and the tail, the latter being much darker in the other species.

== Behaviour ==
It is very gregarious and forms communal roosts when not breeding. Predation by bats at the nest sites has been suspected. The flight call is a rapid chittering sti-sti-stew-stew-stew.

=== Breeding ===
The nest is a 5 cm wide shallow half-saucer of twigs and saliva attached to a vertical surface. This is often a man-made structure like a chimney or manhole, as with its relative, the chimney swift (C. pelagica), but natural caves and tree cavities are also used. Up to seven white eggs (average 3 or 4) are incubated by both parents for 17–18 days. The young leave the nest in a further two weeks, but remain near it, clinging to the cavity wall without flying, for another two weeks.

=== Feeding ===
The swift feeds in flight on flying insects, including winged ants and termites.
