= William Vaux =

William Vaux may refer to:

- William Vaux, 3rd Baron Vaux of Harrowden, English peer
- William Sansom Vaux, American mineralogist
- William Sandys Wright Vaux, English antiquary and numismatist
