= Ashy-tailed swift =

Conservation status
- Vulnerable (IUCN 3.1)

Scientific classification
- Kingdom: Animalia
- Phylum: Chordata
- Class: Aves
- Order: Apodiformes
- Family: Apodidae
- Genus: Chaetura
- Species: C. andrei

Binomial name
- Chaetura andrei Berlepsch & Hartert, 1902

Synonyms
- Chaetura vauxi andrei; Andre's swift

Species of bird

The ashy-tailed swift or Andre's swift (Chaetura andrei) is a Vulnerable species of bird in subfamily Apodinae of the swift family Apodidae. It is endemic to northern and central Venezuela.

== Taxonomy and systematics ==
The taxonomy of this species is confusing. The larger and far more widespread Sick's swift was previously regarded as a subspecies of the ashy-tailed swift, but Marín (1997) found that Sick's swift is more closely related to the chimney swift. Marín further suggested that the ashy-tailed swift was identical to Vaux's swift of the subspecies aphanes. If following this approach, andrei (with aphanes as a junior synonym) becomes a subspecies of Vaux's swift. This placement, however, was considered mistaken by Restall et al. (2006), who state that andrei and aphanes, while virtually identical under normal field conditions, actually do differ and also have different behavior and habitat preferences (ashy-tailed swift prefers forested lowland rivers, while Vaux's swift race aphanes prefers mountain slopes). As of early 2020, taxonomists retained ashy-tailed as a subspecies of Vaux's swift.

A detailed study by Chesser et al. (2018) supported Restall et al.'s assertion that ashy-tailed swift is a separate species from Vaux's swift. Based on those data, the South American Classification Committee of the American Ornithological Society (AOS) split ashy-tailed from Vaux's as its own species in June 2020. The International Ornithological Congress (IOC) followed suit in January 2021.

== Description ==
Ashy-tailed swift is very similar to the widespread Vaux's swift. It is about 11 cm (4.3 in) long and weighs 15 to 22 g (0.53 to 0.78 oz). The wings, like those of most swifts, are long and pointed. It is grayish brown overall, paler on the underside. The ashy-tailed's throat and abdomen tend to be browner than those of Vaux's, the back lighter brown, and the rump paler.

== Distribution and habitat ==
Ashy-tailed swift is endemic to Venezuela, found in deciduous forest of the eastern lowlands and the eastern Coastal Range.

== Behavior ==
Almost nothing is known about the ashy-tailed swift's feeding, breeding, and other behavior. It is an aerial insectivore like all swifts, and its diet is assumed to be insects and spiders.

== Vocalization ==
As of late 2022 xeno-canto had no recordings of the ashy-tailed swift, though one recording attributed to Vaux's swift was taken within its range. The Cornell Lab of Ornithology's Macaulay Library had very few recordings. The species' call is described as a "[h]igh-pitched, rapid chipping and buzzy insect-like twitter given in flight."

== Status ==
The IUCN has classified ashy-tailed swift as Vulnerable due to its estimated population of 2500 to 10,000 mature individuals that is declining due to loss of its forest habitat.
