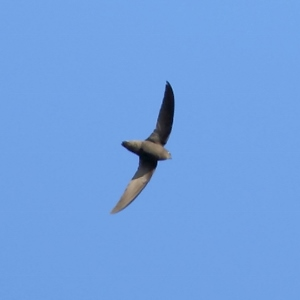
- at Bertioga, São Paulo State, Brazil

Conservation status
- Least Concern (IUCN 3.1)

Scientific classification
- Kingdom: Animalia
- Phylum: Chordata
- Class: Aves
- Order: Apodiformes
- Family: Apodidae
- Genus: Chaetura
- Species: C. meridionalis

Binomial name
- Chaetura meridionalis Hellmayr, 1907

= Sick's swift =

Species of bird

Sick's swift (Chaetura meridionalis) is a species of swift in the family Apodidae. It was previously considered conspecific with the smaller ashy-tailed swift, but a study published in 1997 found that Sick's swift was closer to the chimney swift. The English name commemorates the German-born ornithologist Helmut Sick who studied South American birds. It is a migratory species that breeds in central South America and overwinters in northern South America. The IUCN has listed it as being of "Least Concern".

== Taxonomy ==
Sick's swift was formally described in 1907 by the Austrian ornithologist Carl Eduard Hellmayr from specimens collected in the Santiago del Estero Province of northern Argentina. Hellmayr considered it to be a subspecies of the ashy-tailed swift and coined the trinomial name Chaetura andrei meridionalis. The specific epithet is a Latin word meaning "southern". Based on a study by the ornithologist Manuel Marín, Sick's swift is now considered to be separate from the ashy-tailed swift and has been elevated to species status. The English name commemorates the German-born ornithologist, Helmut Sick, who studied Brazilian birdlife.

== Description ==
The upperparts dark smoky brown. The tail is ashy grey with dark shafts and protruding spines, The throat is grey, lower underparts dark brown, bill and legs black.

== Distribution and habitat ==
It breeds in south-eastern Brazil and adjacent parts of Argentina, Paraguay and Bolivia, but is believed to spend the Austral winter further north in the Amazon basin, northern South America and Panama. Its exact wintering range is, however, poorly known due to the highly complex matter of field identification of a number of very similar Chaetura swifts found in central and northern South America. In addition to the previously mentioned countries, there are records from Colombia, Venezuela, Suriname and French Guiana.

It is generally common, but confirmed records outside its breeding range (where it is the only large Chaetura swift, and therefore relatively easy to identify) are infrequent. Its preferred habitat is lowland evergreen forest edge, secondary forest, open woodland and second-growth scrub but it can be seen flying over virtually any habitat during its annual migration.

== Behaviour ==
=== Breeding ===
The nest, typically placed in a chimney or a hollow tree, is an open cup similar in construction to that of the chimney swift. Constructed almost entirely of one type of dry leaf stalks having a length of 5 cm. The structure of the nest lacks density and is transparent. Adhesive saliva is used on the place of the attachment of the nest and to a lesser degree on its front side. The nest does not have a rear wall, which is represented by the side of the tree. the breeding period of the Chaetura corresponds with the end of the dry season to the beginning of the rainy period. The nest is reused until it falls down, on which occasion the same location is used to build a new nest. Clutch size is 3–5 eggs, the female incubates but both parents feed the young.

=== Feeding ===
Sick's swift feeds in flight on flying insects. It often flies low over roads or clearings in the morning or evening, rising high above the forest, often with other swifts, in the middle of the day.

== Status ==
The population size for the Sick's swift has not been estimated but it is said to be common within its breeding range, which covers over 5,000,000 km^{2} (1,900,000 sq mi), and less common in its wintering range. There is no evidence that the population is declining nor are there any particular threats to this bird apparent, so the IUCN has listed this species as being of "Least Concern".
