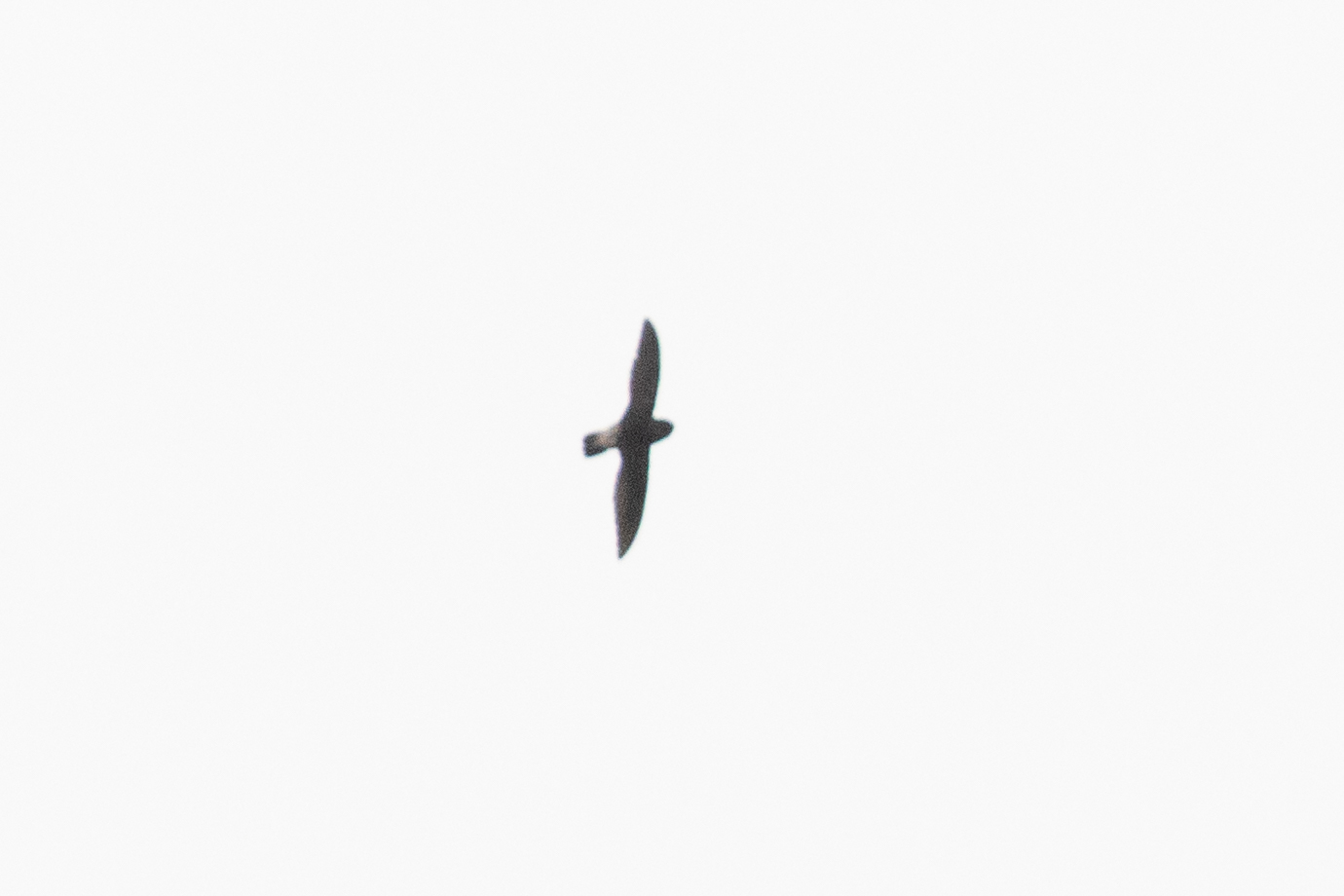

Conservation status
- Least Concern (IUCN 3.1)

Scientific classification
- Kingdom: Animalia
- Phylum: Chordata
- Class: Aves
- Order: Apodiformes
- Family: Apodidae
- Genus: Chaetura
- Species: C. egregia

Binomial name
- Chaetura egregia Todd, 1916

Synonyms
- Acanthylis egregia

= Pale-rumped swift =

Species of bird

The pale-rumped swift (Chaetura egregia) is a species of bird in subfamily Apodinae of the swift family Apodidae. It is found in Bolivia, Brazil, Colombia, Ecuador, and Peru.

== Taxonomy and systematics ==
The pale-rumped swift has at times been treated as conspecific with the grey-rumped swift (C. cinereiventris). The two of them, the band-rumped swift (C. spinicaudus), and the Lesser Antillean swift (C. martinica) were at one time placed in genus Acanthylis. The pale-rumped swift is monotypic.

== Description ==
The pale-rumped swift is about 10.5 cm (4.1 in) long and weighs about 23 g (0.81 oz). It has a protruding head, a short square tail, and wings that bulge in the middle and somewhat hook at the end. The sexes are alike. Their upperparts are black with a bronze gloss and a whitish rump and uppertail coverts. Their underparts are mostly dark, with a pale throat and blackish undertail coverts.

== Distribution and habitat ==
The pale-rumped swift is found in eastern Ecuador, eastern Peru, western Brazil, and northwestern Bolivia and has been recorded as a vagrant in Colombia. It principally inhabits lowland tropical evergreen forest but also occurs over more open landscapes and urban areas.

== Behavior ==
=== Movement ===
The pale-rumped swift is thought to be a year-round resident throughout its range.

=== Feeding ===
Like all swifts, the pale-rumped is an aerial insectivore. It often feeds with other species of swift and tends to stay in the lower part of the flock. No details of its diet are known.

=== Breeding ===
Nothing is known about the pale-rumped swift's breeding phenology and its nest and eggs have not been described.

=== Vocalization ===
The pale-rumped swift's main vocalizations are "a single-noted 'tsee'...and more complex twittering calls such as 'tsee-titi' or 'titi-tsee-trtr'."

== Status ==
The IUCN has assessed the pale-rumped swift as being of Least Concern, though its population size is not known and is believed to be decreasing. No immediate threats have been identified. It is generally thought to be one of the rarer members of genus Chaetura but at least in parts of Peru it is more common than some of the others and is abundant in parts of Ecuador.
