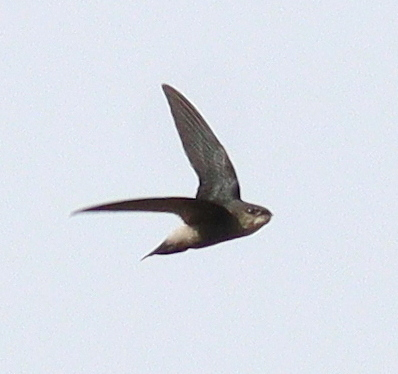

Conservation status
- Least Concern (IUCN 3.1)

Scientific classification
- Kingdom: Animalia
- Phylum: Chordata
- Class: Aves
- Clade: Strisores
- Order: Apodiformes
- Family: Apodidae
- Genus: Chaetura
- Species: C. fumosa

Binomial name
- Chaetura fumosa Salvin, 1870

Synonyms
- Acanthylis spinicaudus fumosa

= Costa Rican swift =

Species of bird

The Costa Rican swift (Chaetura fumosa) is a species of bird in subfamily Apodinae of the swift family Apodidae. It is found in Costa Rica and Panama.

== Taxonomy and systematics ==
During much of the 20th century the Costa Rican swift was treated as a subspecies of the band-rumped swift (C. spinicaudus). Before that time it was placed in genus Acanthylis with several other swifts that are now classified in genus Chaetura. The Costa Rican swift is monotypic.

== Description ==
The Costa Rican swift is about 11 cm (4.3 in) long. The sexes are alike. Their head is dusky. Their upperparts are mostly sooty black with a blue gloss and a pale grayish rump and dull black uppertail coverts. Their throat and breast are pale grayish.

== Distribution and habitat ==
The Costa Rican swift is found from southwestern Costa Rica east into western Panama's Chiriquí Province. The International Ornithological Committee places it in Colombia as well, but the South American Classification Committee of the American Ornithological Society has no records from that country. It occurs over several forest types, semi-open areas, pastures, and agricultural fields. In elevation it mostly occurs below 900 m (3,000 ft) but is found as high as 1,200 m (3,900 ft) in the more humid parts of its range.

== Behavior ==
=== Movement ===
The Costa Rican swift is considered a year-round resident throughout its range.

=== Feeding ===
Like all swifts, the Costa Rican is an aerial insectivore. It often forages in flocks with other swift species and swallows. When it forages only with conspecifics the flocks can have up to 50 individuals. Its diet is thought to be essentially the same as that of the band-rumped swift; a study in Panama found that species' diet there was mostly Diptera, Hymenoptera, and Coleoptera.

=== Breeding ===
Nothing is known about the Costa Rican swift's breeding phenology and its nest and eggs have not been described.

=== Vocalization ===
The Costa Rican swift makes "high-pitched calls such as single 'weet', 'tsew' or 'tsee' notes" and usually combines them with "longer twittering series such as 'titititititititi' or 'titititrrrr'."

== Status ==
The IUCN has assessed the Costa Rican swift as being of Least Concern. Though it has a somewhat restricted range its estimated population of between 20,000 and 50,000 mature individuals is believed to be stable. No immediate threats have been identified. It is "[o]ften the commonest Chaetura within its range" and is considered abundant in the Costa Rican lowlands though rare in Panama. It occurs in several protected areas.
