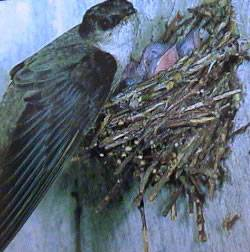
- Chimney swift Chaetura pelagica

Scientific classification
- Kingdom: Animalia
- Phylum: Chordata
- Class: Aves
- Order: Apodiformes
- Family: Apodidae
- Subfamily: Apodinae
- Genus: Chaetura; Stephens, 1826

Species
- 11 living, see text

= Chaetura =

Genus of birds

Chaetura is a genus of needletail swifts found in the Americas. Although they resemble swallows, the two are not at all closely related; this is instead a result of convergent evolution. Some members of Chaetura are long-distance migrants, while others are year-round residents.

== Taxonomy ==
The genus Chaetura was introduced in 1826 by the English naturalist James Francis Stephens who listed several species in the genus but did not specify a type. In 1829 the English zoologist William Swainson selected the type as Chaetura pelasgia Stevens (sic). This is a junior synonym of Hirundo pelagica Linnaeus the chimney swift. The genus name combines the Ancient Greek χαιτη/khaitē meaning "long flowing hair" with ουρα/oura meaning "tail".

== Species ==
The genus contains 11 species:

- Grey-rumped swift, Chaetura cinereiventris – widespread in South America
- Band-rumped swift, Chaetura spinicaudus – Panama to central Brazil
- Lesser Antillean swift, Chaetura martinica – Lesser Antilles
- Costa Rican swift, Chaetura fumosa – Costa Rica, Panama and north Colombia
- Pale-rumped swift, Chaetura egregia – west Amazonia
- Chimney swift, Chaetura pelagica – breeds in central south, southeast Canada and central, east USA; winters west South America
- Vaux's swift, Chaetura vauxi – west Canada to north South America
- Chapman's swift, Chaetura chapmani – Panama to northeast Brazil and west Amazonia
- Ashy-tailed swift, Chaetura andrei – east Venezuela
- Sick's swift, Chaetura meridionalis – breeds south Brazil to east Bolivia, Paraguay and north Argentina; winters north South America and Panama
- Short-tailed swift, Chaetura brachyura – Panama through Amazonia

A fossil species, Chaetura baconica, was described from Late Miocene deposits of Hungary.
