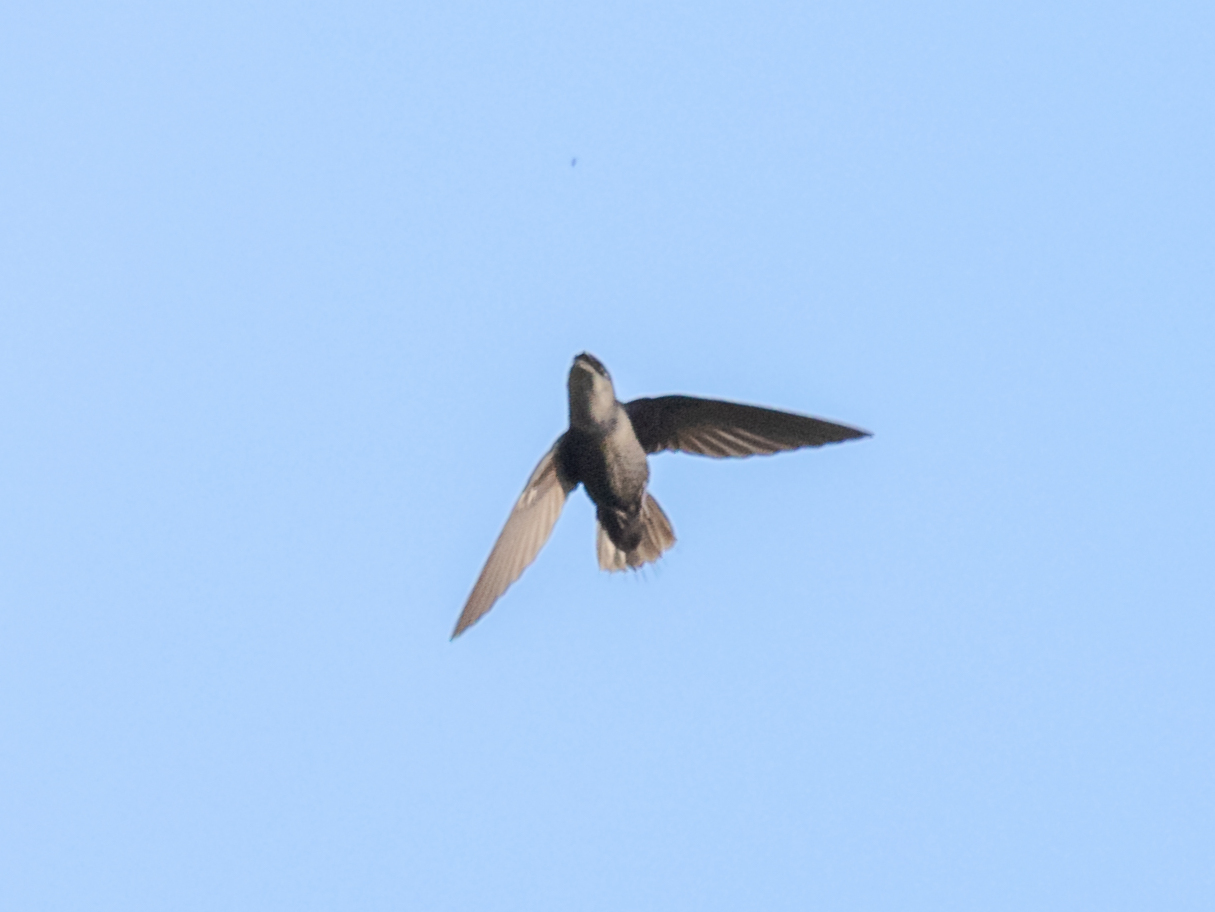

Conservation status
- Least Concern (IUCN 3.1)

Scientific classification
- Kingdom: Animalia
- Phylum: Chordata
- Class: Aves
- Order: Apodiformes
- Family: Apodidae
- Genus: Chaetura
- Species: C. chapmani

Binomial name
- Chaetura chapmani Hellmayr, 1907

Synonyms
- Chaetura viridipennis

= Chapman's swift =

Species of bird

Chapman's swift (Chaetura chapmani) is a species of bird in subfamily Apodinae of the swift family Apodidae. It is found in Bolivia, Brazil, Colombia, French Guiana, Guyana, Panama, Peru, Suriname, Trinidad, Venezuela, and possibly Ecuador.

== Taxonomy and systematics ==
Chapman's swift has two subspecies, the nominate C. c. chapmani and C. c. viridipennis. For a time in the late 20th century viridipennis was treated as a separate species, the "Amazonian" or "Mato Grosso" swift but taxonomic systems soon returned to the previous two-subspecies model. Long ago, Chapman's swift, chimney swift (C. pelagica), and Vaux's swift (C. vauxi) were treated as a single species.

The species' English name and specific epithet honor "that famous student of Neotropical birds, Frank M. Chapman".

== Description ==
Chapman's swift is 13 to 14 cm (5.1 to 5.5 in) long and weighs 20.75 to 28 g (0.73 to 0.99 oz). It has a protruding head, a short square tail, and wings that bulge in the middle and somewhat hook at the end. The sexes are alike. The nominate subspecies has glossy black upperparts with a dark gray rump and uppertail coverts. Its underparts are entirely dark brown. Subspecies C. c. viridipennis is somewhat larger than the nominate; it has essentially the same plumage but almost no contrast between the gray rump and black back.

== Distribution and habitat ==
The nominate subspecies of Chapman's swift is found in Panama, western and northern Colombia, and northwestern Venezuela; separate from there in eastern Venezuela, the Guianas, and northeastern Brazil; and also on Trinidad. C. c. viridipennis is found in eastern Peru, eastern Bolivia, and western Amazonian Brazil. Undocumented sight records in Ecuador lead the South American Classification Committee of the American Ornithological Society to list it as hypothetical in that country.

Chapman's swift mainly inhabits tropical lowland evergreen forest, secondary forest, and secondary scrublands. It has been recorded feeding over coastal swamps and mangroves. In Colombia it ranges in elevation from sea level to 1,600 m (5,200 ft), in northern Venezuela to 600 m (2,000 ft), in southern Venezuela to 200 m (660 ft), and in Amazonian Brazil to about 800 m (2,600 ft).

== Behavior ==
=== Migration ===
The nominate subspecies of Chapman's swift is a year-round resident throughout both parts of its range. C. c. viridipennis leaves Bolivia and parts of Peru and western Brazil after the breeding season and apparently moves further east in Brazil.

=== Feeding ===
Like all swifts, Chapman's is an aerial insectivore. It often feeds with other species of swift, but also in flocks of only its kind.

=== Breeding ===
The nominate subspecies of Chapman's swift nests in the wet season of late spring to early autumn. C. c. viridipennis apparently nests in the austral summer. Very few nests are known; they are half a cup attached to a vertical surface, often human-made such as a chimney. There is speculation that it also nests in hollow trees. The clutch size is two or three eggs and the incubation period is 17 to 18 days.

=== Vocalization ===
The principal call of Chapman's swift is "a long series of strident single notes...'tseep..tseep..tseep..tseep.tseep.tseep..tseep..tseep...tseep...tseep...', with seldom any twittering trills." It also makes "repeated shorter 'tsip' calls."

== Status ==
The IUCN has assessed Chapman's swift as being of Least Concern. It has a very large range and an estimated population of at least 50,000 mature individuals, though the latter is believed to be decreasing. No immediate threats have been identified. It is "[o]ne of [the] rarer South American swifts with few specimens or observations...precise limits of [its] breeding range [are] not well known."
