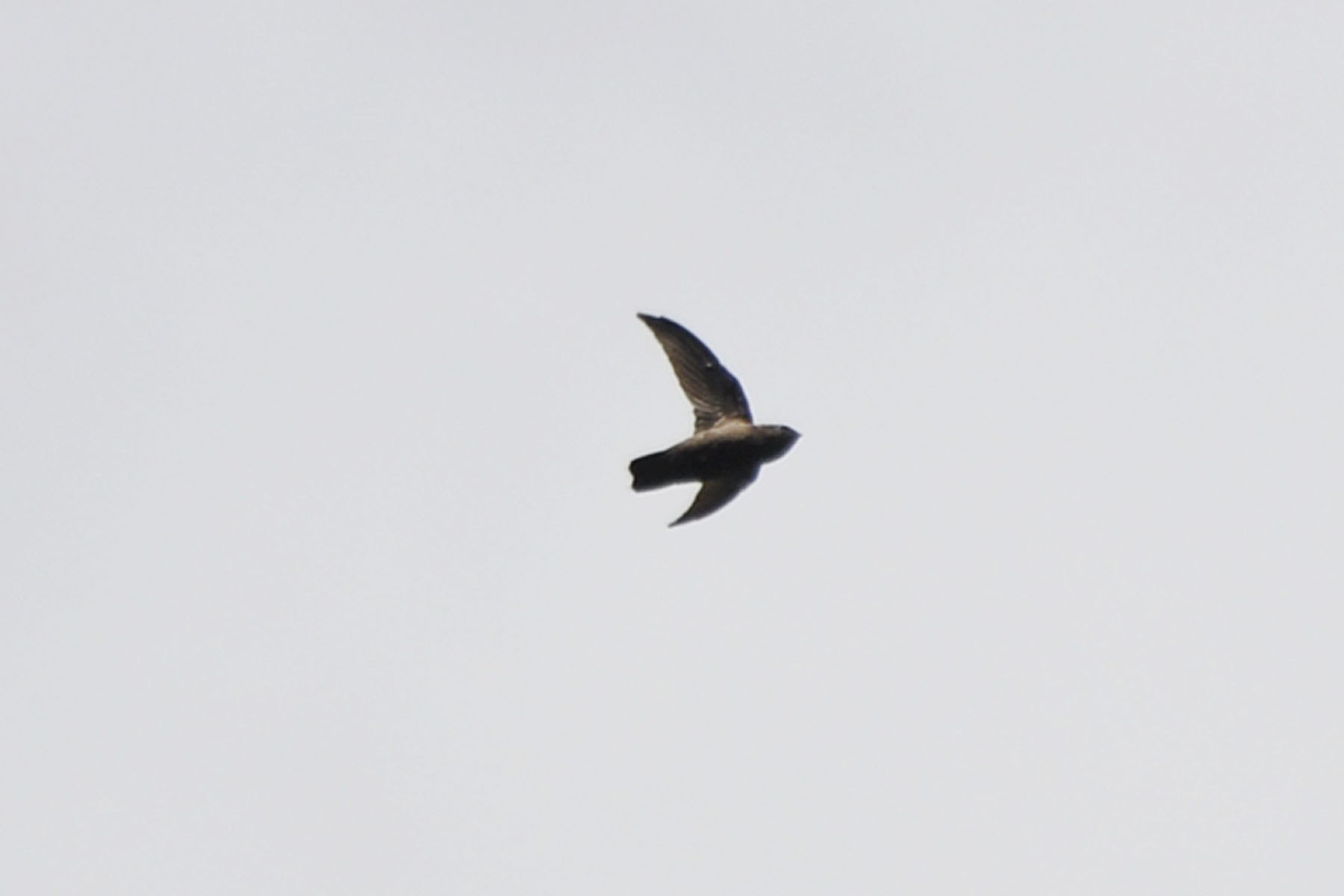

Conservation status
- Least Concern (IUCN 3.1)

Scientific classification
- Kingdom: Animalia
- Phylum: Chordata
- Class: Aves
- Clade: Strisores
- Order: Apodiformes
- Family: Apodidae
- Genus: Chaetura
- Species: C. martinica

Binomial name
- Chaetura martinica (Hermann, 1783)

Synonyms
- Acanthylis martinica

= Lesser Antillean swift =

Species of bird

The Lesser Antillean swift (Chaetura martinica) is a species a species of bird in subfamily Apodinae of the swift family Apodidae. It is found on Dominica, Guadeloupe, Martinique, Saint Lucia, Saint Vincent, and possibly Nevis.

== Taxonomy and systematics ==
The Lesser Antillean swift, pale-rumped swift (C. egregia), grey-rumped swift (C. cinereiventris), and band-rumped swift (C. spinicaudus) were at one time placed in genus Acanthylis. The Lesser Antillean swift is monotypic.

== Description ==
The Lesser Antillean swift is 10.5 to 11 cm (4.1 to 4.3 in) long and weighs an average of 12.7 g (0.45 oz). It has a protruding head, a short square tail, and wings that bulge in the middle and somewhat hook at the end. The sexes are alike. Adults have black-brown upperparts with a narrow gray band on the rump. Their underparts are brown with a paler throat. Juveniles have white tips on some wing feathers.

== Distribution and habitat ==
The Lesser Antillean swift is found on the islands of Guadeloupe in the southern Leeward Islands and Dominica, Martinique, Saint Lucia, and Saint Vincent in the Windward Islands. There is also an undocumented sight record further north on Nevis. It principally inhabits tropical lowland evergreen forest but is also found over secondary forest and open areas including drier ones.

== Behavior ==
=== Movement ===
The Lesser Antillean swift is a year-round resident throughout its range.

=== Feeding ===
Like all swifts, the Lesser Antillean is an aerial insectivore. It usually forages in flocks of 20 to 40; the flocks often include swallows. No details of its diet are known.

=== Breeding ===
The Lesser Antillean swift's breeding season appears to be in late spring and early summer. It makes a half-cup nest attached to a vertical surface. The clutch size is three eggs. Nothing else is known about the species' breeding biology.

=== Vocalization ===
The Lesser Antillean swift's principal call is "a high-pitched twittering trill 'prrrrrrrr' or 'prrrrrrr-titi' given at intervals."

== Status ==
The IUCN has assessed the Lesser Antillean swift as being of Least Concern. It has a limited range and its population size is unknown but believed to be stable. No immediate threats have been identified. It is considered uncommon on Guadeloupe and fairly common on the other islands.
