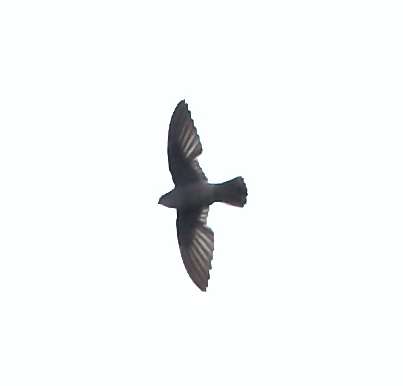

Conservation status
- Least Concern (IUCN 3.1)

Scientific classification
- Kingdom: Animalia
- Phylum: Chordata
- Class: Aves
- Order: Apodiformes
- Family: Apodidae
- Genus: Chaetura
- Species: C. spinicaudus

Binomial name
- Chaetura spinicaudus (Temminck, 1839)

Synonyms
- Acanthylis spinicauda

= Band-rumped swift =

Species of bird

The band-rumped swift (Chaetura spinicaudus) is a species of bird in subfamily Apodinae of the swift family Apodidae. It is found from Panama south through Colombia into Ecuador, east from Venezuela into the Guianas and Brazil, and on Trinidad.

== Taxonomy and systematics ==
The band-rumped swift, pale-rumped swift (C. egregia), grey-rumped swift (C. cinereiventris), and Lesser Antillean swift (C. martinica) were at one time placed in genus Acanthylis. During much of the 20th century the Costa Rican swift (C. fumosa) was treated as a subspecies of the band-rumped. Since then the band-rumped swift has been assigned two subspecies, the nominate C. s. spinicaudus and C. s. aetherodroma. Other subspecies have been proposed but not accepted.

== Description ==
The band-rumped swift is 10.5 to 12.6 cm (4.1 to 5.0 in) long and weighs 13.8 to 18.5 g (0.49 to 0.65 oz). It has a protruding head, a short square tail, and wings that bulge in the middle and somewhat hook at the end. The sexes are alike. Adults of the nominate subspecies have black-brown upperparts with a white band on the rump. Their underparts are dark with a slightly paler throat. Juveniles have white tips on some wing feathers. Subspecies C. s. aetherodroma is smaller than the nominate; its rump patch is grayer and its throat paler.

== Distribution and habitat ==
The nominate subspecies of band-rumped swift is found in eastern Venezuela, the Guianas, and north and central Brazil. There is also a small isolated population in coastal eastern Brazil. Subspecies C. s. aetherodroma is found from central Panama south through western Colombia to southwestern Ecuador. In most of its range it inhabits the edges of lowland evergreen forest and secondary forest. In Amazonia it is also found over highland forest and cleared areas, and in northern Venezuela inhabits only open areas.

== Behavior ==
=== Movement ===
The band-rumped swift is a year-round resident throughout its range.

=== Feeding ===
Like all swifts, the band-rumped is an aerial insectivore. It feeds in single-species flocks at fairly high altitude, but when it feeds with other species of swift it tends to stay in the lower part of the flock. It often feeds over water at dawn and dusk. A study in Panama found its diet there was mostly Diptera, Hymenoptera, and Coleoptera. It addition to feeding on the wing, it has been observed hovering briefly to take prey from foliage.

=== Breeding ===
The band-rumped swift's breeding season apparently varies geographically but in general is within February to June. On Trinidad it nests in hollow trees. Nothing else is known about its breeding biology.

=== Vocalization ===
The nominate subspecies of band-rumped swift "gives a diagnostic bisyllabic 'pseee-trr' or more burry 'prrrree-trtr'" and sometimes also "several repeated notes 'tsee-tsee-tsee'". The vocalizations of subspecies C. s. aetherodroma are not well known.

== Status ==
The IUCN has assessed the band-rumped swift as being of Least Concern. It has a very large range and an estimated population of at least 500,000 mature individuals. The population is believed to be slowly decreasing. No immediate threats have been identified. It is considered uncommon to common in Ecuador and common to abundant in most of the rest of its range. It occurs in many protected areas.
