= William Sansom Vaux =

American mineralogist (1811–1882)

William Samsom Vaux
- Born: May 19, 1811; Philadelphia, Pennsylvania, U.S.
- Died: May 5, 1882 (aged 70)
- Resting place: Laurel Hill Cemetery, Philadelphia, Pennsylvania, U.S.
- Known for: Mineralogy; Archaeology

William Sansom Vaux (May 19, 1811 – May 5, 1882) was an American mineralogist. He served as vice-president of the Academy of Natural Sciences in Philadelphia from 1864 to 1882 and as president of the Zoological Society of Philadelphia. His mineral and archaeological collections were bequeathed to the Academy of Natural Sciences after his death.

== Early life ==
Vaux was born on May 19, 1811, in Philadelphia to George and Eliza H. Vaux. His ancestors were early Quaker settlers of the Province of Pennsylvania and amassed great wealth through their businesses. Vaux left the Quaker religion at a young age and joined the Episcopal Church. He inherited his parents wealth after their deaths and never engaged in business. His inheritance allowed him to dedicate his time toward the study of science and mineralogy in particular.

== Career ==
He became a member of the Academy of Natural Sciences in 1834, and served in various capacities, including as vice-president from 1864 to 1882. Vaux made several trips to Europe to collect mineral specimens, and his collection was considered to be the finest in the United States. Vaux was one of eight founders of the Numismatic and Antiquarian Society of Philadelphia and served as vice-president. He served as president of the Zoological Society of Philadelphia. He was elected to the American Philosophical Society in 1859.

In 1859, he purchased the James McBride collection of archaeological surveys, field notes and drawings of artifacts at a public auction.

== Personal life ==
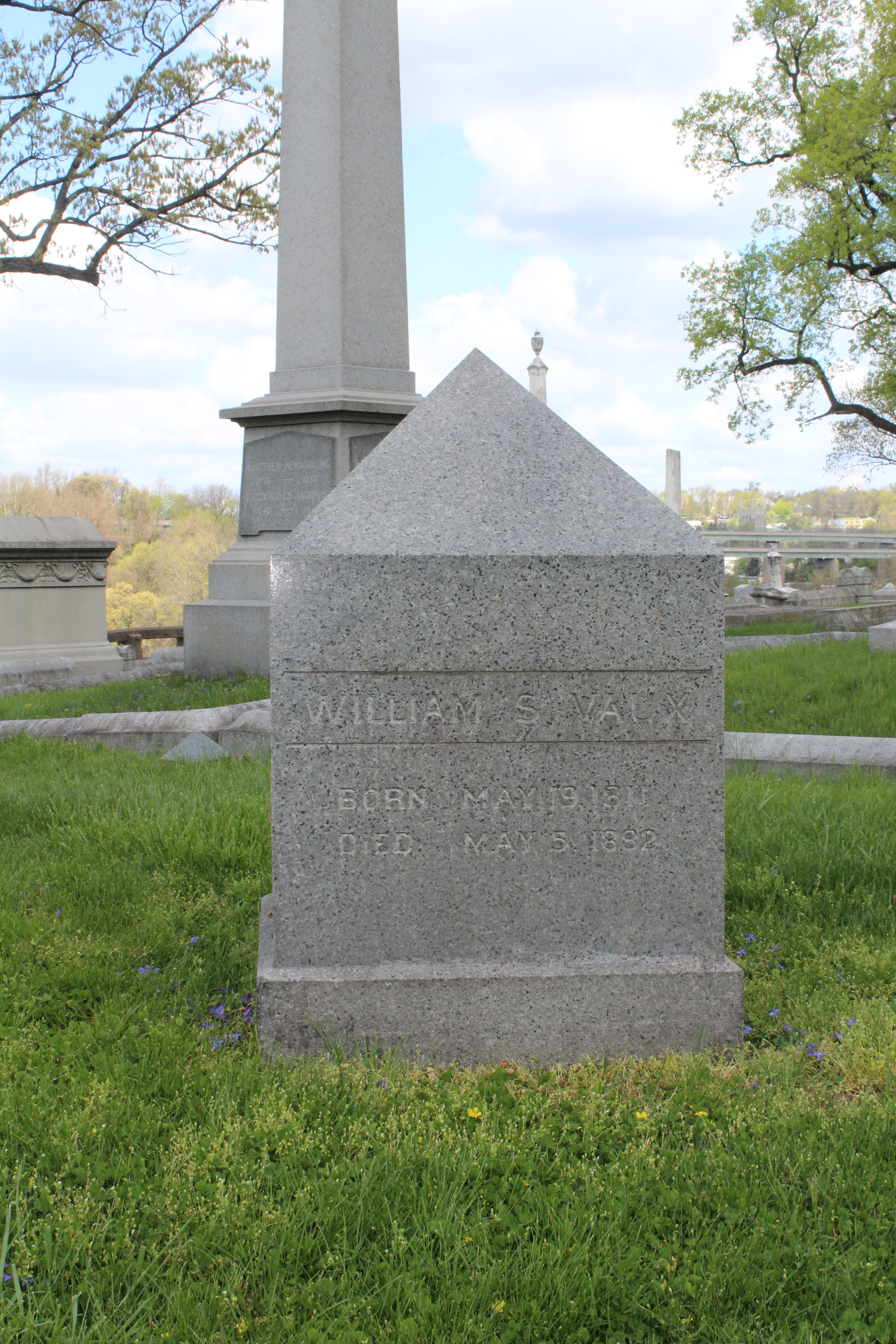
Vaux's gravestone in Laurel Hill Cemetery

Vaux was married but his wife died several years before him. They had one son together, however he died at an early age. Vaux became infirm toward the end of his life from a disease contracted from travelling in Rome. He died on May 5, 1882, of a tumor-like growth in his abdomen and was interred at Laurel Hill Cemetery.

== Legacy ==
He bequeathed his mineral and archaeological collections to the Academy of Natural Sciences, along with his library and an endowment for their preservation. His collection of James McBride's archaeological surveys, field notes, and surveys has been on loan indefinitely since 1960 from the Academy of Natural Sciences to the Ohio Historical Society.

The Vaux's swift was named in his honor by John Kirk Townsend.

In 1986, his great-nephews donated his collection of Roman glass to the University of Pennsylvania Museum of Archaeology and Anthropology.
