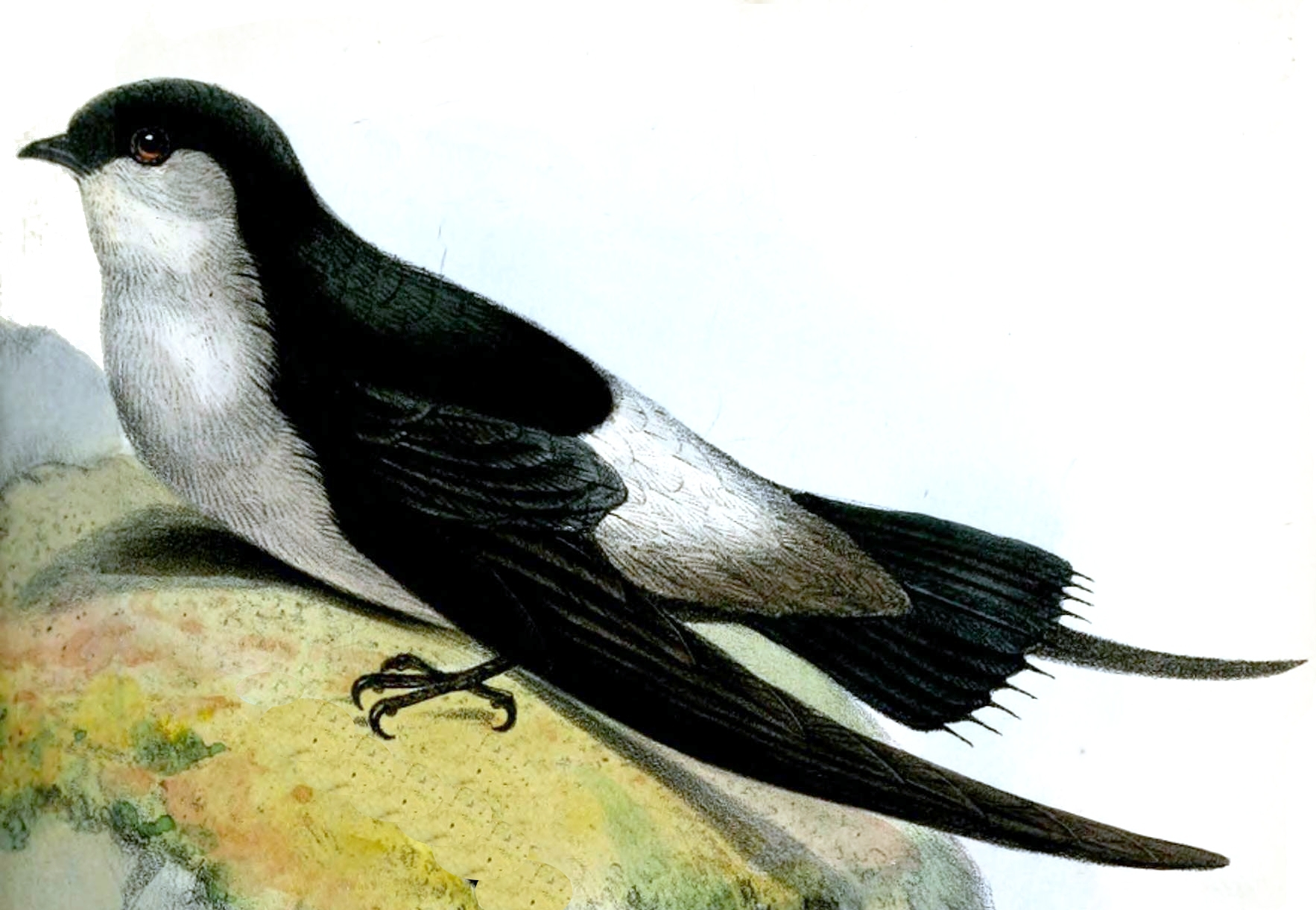

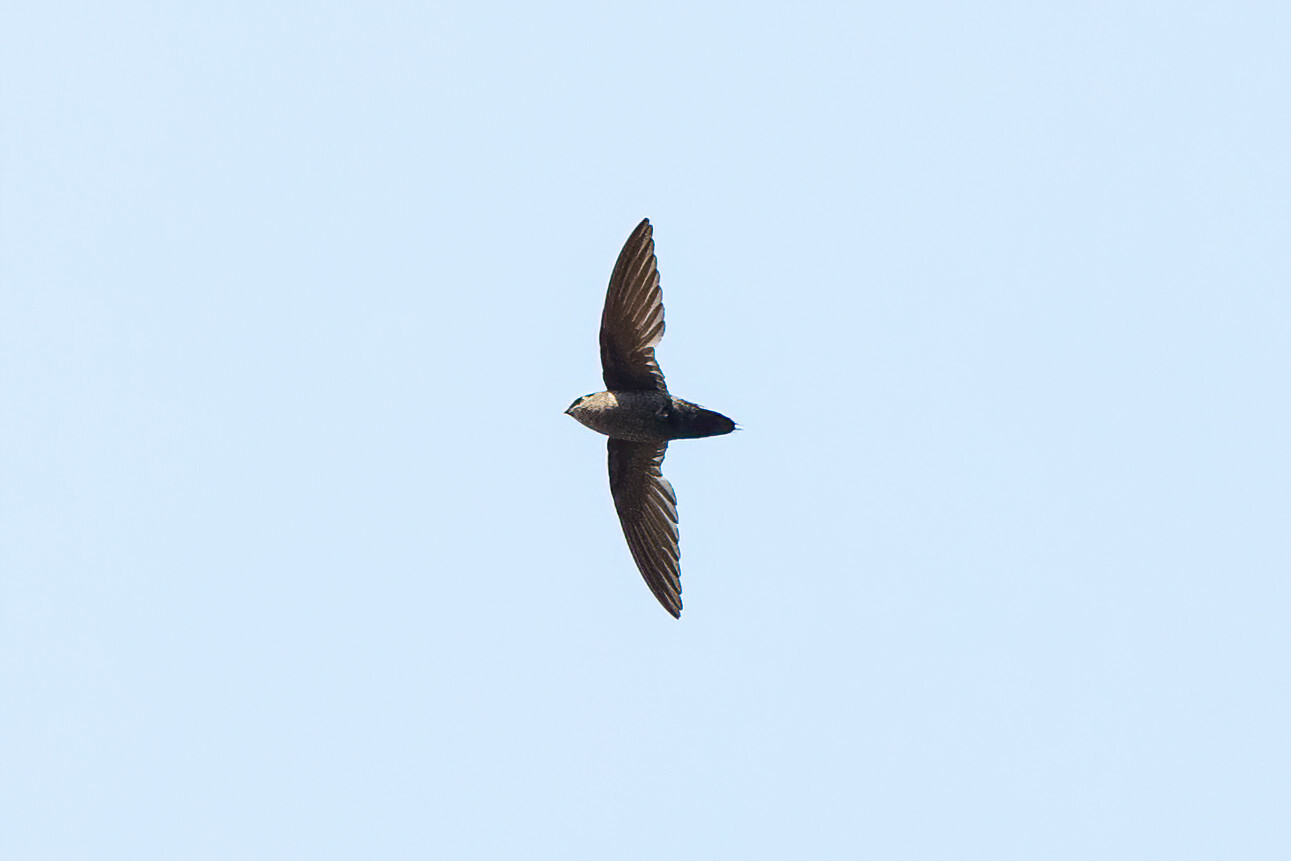

Conservation status
- Least Concern (IUCN 3.1)

Scientific classification
- Kingdom: Animalia
- Phylum: Chordata
- Class: Aves
- Clade: Strisores
- Order: Apodiformes
- Family: Apodidae
- Genus: Chaetura
- Species: C. cinereiventris

Binomial name
- Chaetura cinereiventris Sclater, PL, 1862

Synonyms
- Acanthylis cinereiventris

= Grey-rumped swift =

Species of bird

The grey-rumped swift or gray-rumped swift (Chaetura cinereiventris) is a species of bird in subfamily Apodinae of the swift family Apodidae. It is found in Honduras, Nicaragua, Costa Rica, and Panama; in every mainland South American country except Chile, French Guiana, Suriname, and Uruguay; in Trinidad and Tobago; and on Grenada.

== Taxonomy and systematics ==
The grey-rumped swift has these seven subspecies:

- C. c. phaeopygos Hellmayr, 1906
- C. c. lawrencei Ridgway, 1893
- C. c. schistacea Todd, 1937
- C. c. guianensis Hartert, E.J.O., 1892
- C. c. occidentalis Berlepsch & Taczanowski, 1884
- C. c. sclateri Pelzeln, 1868
- C. c. cinereiventris Sclater, P.L., 1862

The grey-rumped swift, pale-rumped swift (C. egregia), band-rumped swift (C. spinicaudus), and Lesser Antillean swift (C. martinica) were at one time placed in genus Acanthylis. Some authors have suggested that the grey-rumped and pale-rumped swifts are conspecific. Others have suggested that all of the grey-rumped subspecies except the nominate C. c. cinereiventris belong to another species under the binomial C. sclateri.

== Description ==
The grey-rumped swift is about 10.5 cm (4.1 in) long and weighs about 17 g (0.60 oz). It has a protruding head, a short square tail, and wings that bulge in the middle and somewhat hook at the end. The sexes are alike. Adults of the nominate subspecies have mostly glossy black upperparts with a wide gray rump and uppertail coverts. Their underparts are a lighter gray than the rump, though darker on the undertail coverts. Juveniles are essentially the same as adults with the addition of pale fringes to many of the wing feathers.

Subspecies C. c. phaeopygos differs from the nominate only by having pale undertail coverts. C. c. lawrencei has slightly darker underparts than the nominate and black undertail coverts that contrast with the belly. C. c. schistacea has darker upperparts than the nominate, with a steely blue gloss, and also deep gray underparts. C. c. guianensis is almost identical to the nominate. C. c. occidentalis and C. c. sclateri have the darkest rumps of all the subspecies and blackish gray bellies.

== Distribution and habitat ==
The subspecies of grey-rumped swift are found thus:

- C. c. phaeopygos, northeastern Honduras and from eastern Nicaragua through Costa Rica into northwestern Panama
- C. c. lawrencei, northern Venezuela, Trinidad, Tobago, and Grenada
- C. c. schistacea, the Andes from western Venezuela's Mérida state into eastern Colombia's Boyacá Department
- C. c. guianensis, eastern Venezuela and western Guyana
- C. c. occidentalis, from western Colombia through western Ecuador into extreme northwestern Peru's Tumbes department
- C. c. sclateri, patchily in southern Venezuela, southern Colombia, northwestern Brazil's upper Amazon basin, eastern Peru, and northwestern Bolivia
- C. c. cinereiventris, southeastern Brazil south from Bahia through eastern Paraguay into Argentina's Misiones Province

The grey-rumped swift inhabits a variety of landscapes including lowland tropical evergreen forest, montane evergreen forest, seasonally flooded tropical evergreen forest, and secondary forest. In elevation it ranges from sea level to 1,800 m (5,900 ft).

== Behavior ==
=== Migration ===
The grey-rumped swift is a year-round resident in most or all of its range. In Paraguay and Argentina it is possibly only a breeding species but there is evidence that it is resident there as well.

=== Feeding ===
Like all swifts, the grey-rumped is an aerial insectivore. It usually forages in flocks, typically of 20 to 40 birds. The flocks may be of it alone but may also have a mix of swift species and even swallows. Its diet includes flying ants, bees, wasps, beetles, and flies.

=== Breeding ===
The grey-rumped swift's breeding season varies throughout its range; examples are between September and March in southeastern Brazil and March to July in Costa Rica. It builds a half-cup nest on the vertical interior wall of a chimney or similar structure; it may be rebuilt and reused. Both parents incubate the clutch of two to four eggs at night. The incubation period and time to fledging are not known.

=== Vocalization ===
The principal vocalizations of the grey-rumped swift's nominate subspecies are "a bright repeated short 'tsip'" and a "series of 3–4 slightly downslurred burry drawn-out notes 'trrreeew-trrreeew-trrreeew'." The other subspecies' vocalizations vary but are similar to them.

== Status ==
The IUCN has assessed the grey-rumped swift as being of Least Concern. It has an extremely large range and an estimated population of 50 million mature individuals. The population is believed to be slowly decreasing. No immediate threats have been identified. It is "[o]ne of the commonest Chaetura swifts throughout [its] range", is abundant in some areas, and occurs in several protected areas.
