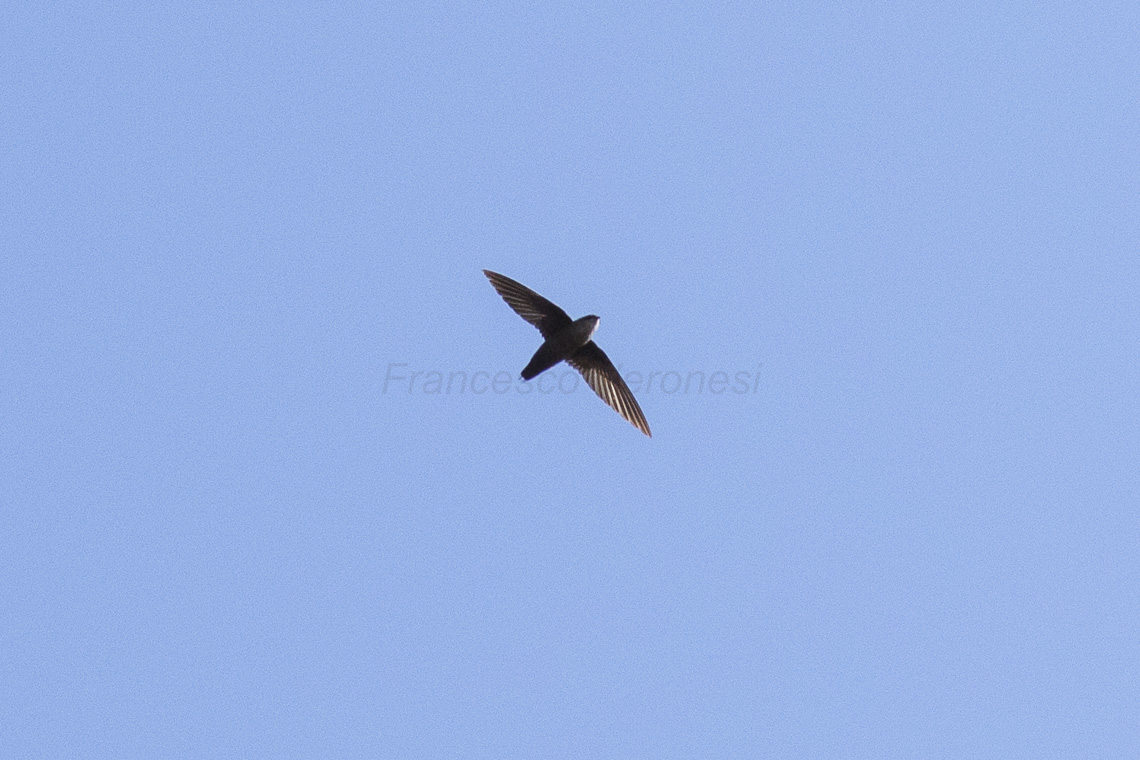
- In flight in Costa Rica

Conservation status
- Least Concern (IUCN 3.1)

Scientific classification
- Kingdom: Animalia
- Phylum: Chordata
- Class: Aves
- Clade: Strisores
- Order: Apodiformes
- Family: Apodidae
- Genus: Chaetura
- Species: C. vauxi

Binomial name
- Chaetura vauxi (Townsend, 1839)
- Breeding Migration Year-round

= Vaux's swift =

Species of bird

Vaux's swift (Chaetura vauxi) is a small swift native to North America, Central America, and northern South America. It was named for the American scientist William Sansom Vaux.

== Description ==
This is a small swift, even compared to other Chaetura species, at 10.7 to 11.2 cm (4.2 to 4.4 in) long and weighing 18 g (0.63 oz). The northern populations are slightly larger at 11.5 cm (4.5 in), probably according to the Bergmann's Rule and/or migration requirements. It has a cigar-shaped body, crescentic wings and a short bluntly squared-off tail. The head, upperparts and wings are dusky black, and the underparts, rump and tail coverts are greyish brown. The throat is paler grey, becoming whitish in northern birds. The sexes are similar, but juveniles have dusky bases to the throat feathers.

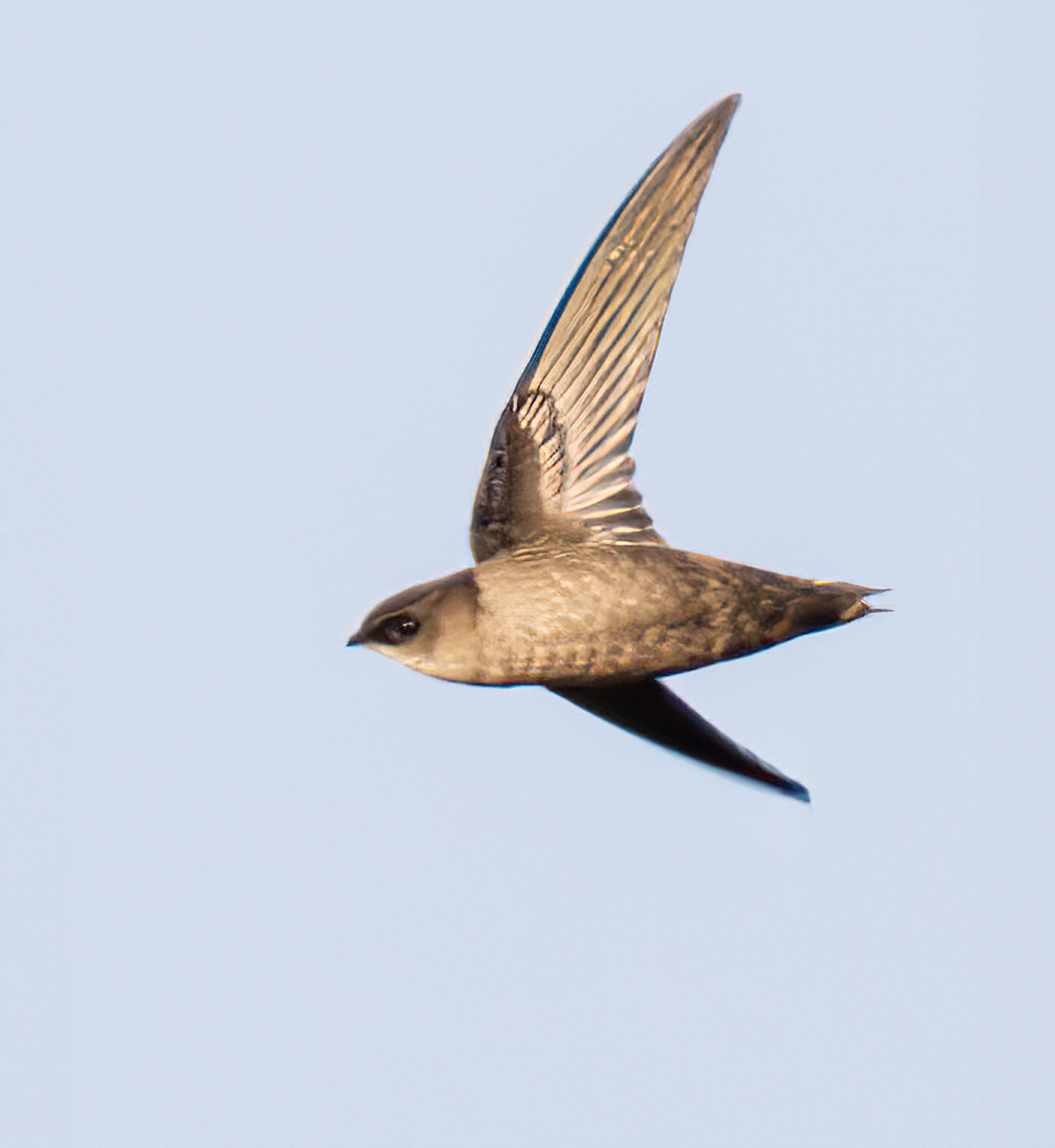
Up-close photo of Vaux's swift

== Distribution and habitat ==
Vaux's swift breeds in highlands from southern Alaska to central California and from southern Mexico, the northern Yucatán Peninsula, to eastern Panama and northern Venezuela. The United States' populations are migratory, wintering from central Mexico south through the Central American breeding range. The resident breeding birds in the southern part of the range are sometimes considered a separate species, dusky-backed swift, Chaetura richmondi. Preferred habitats include old growth coniferous or deciduous forests consisting of coniferous and deciduous vegetation; requires large, hollow trees for nesting.

== Behaviour ==
This is a gregarious species, with flocks of 30 or more birds, and often with other swift species, such as white-collared, especially at weather fronts. It flies with a mixture of stiff wing-beats and unsteady glides. It has more varied calls than others in the genus, with a mixture of chattering, buzzes, squeaks and chips.

=== Feeding ===
The swift feeds in flight on flying insects, including beetles, wasps, termites and flying ants. It forages over forests and more open areas, including towns.

=== Breeding ===
Vaux's swift breeds in the mountains and foothills, from southeastern Alaska and Montana to central California, mainly above 700 m (2,300 ft). It builds a cup nest of twigs and saliva on a vertical surface in a dark cavity, such as a tree hole, cliff crevice or attic. It lays three white eggs between March and July. It spends winters in the tropics.

=== Nesting ===
Vaux's swift builds saucer-shaped nests of twigs or spruce and pine needles stuck to an inside surface of a hollow tree or chimney, between 20 inches and 6 feet from the bottom of the cavity.

== Taxonomy and systematics ==
This species was named for William Sansom Vaux, pronounced "vox".

=== Subspecies ===
The following seven subspecies are recognized by the International Ornithological Congress as of early 2021:

- Chaetura vauxi aphanes (Wetmore & Phelps, 1956): Northern Venezuela.
- Chaetura vauxi gaumeri (Lawrence, 1882): Yucatán Peninsula and Cozumel Island (Mexico).
- Chaetura vauxi ochropygia (Aldrich, 1937): Eastern Panama.
- Chaetura vauxi richmondi (Ridgway, 1910): Southern Mexico to Costa Rica.
- Chaetura vauxi warneri (A.R. Phillips, 1966):Western Mexico.
- Chaetura vauxi tamaulipensis (Sutton, 1941): Eastern Mexico.
- Chaetura vauxi vauxi (J. K. Townsend, 1839): Western Canada to southwestern USA.

The former subspecies Chaetura vauxi andrei of eastern Venezuela was recognised as a distinct species, the ashy-tailed swift, by the South American Classification Committee of the American Ornithological Society (AOS) in June 2020 and the IOC in January 2021.

== Swifts at Chapman Elementary School ==
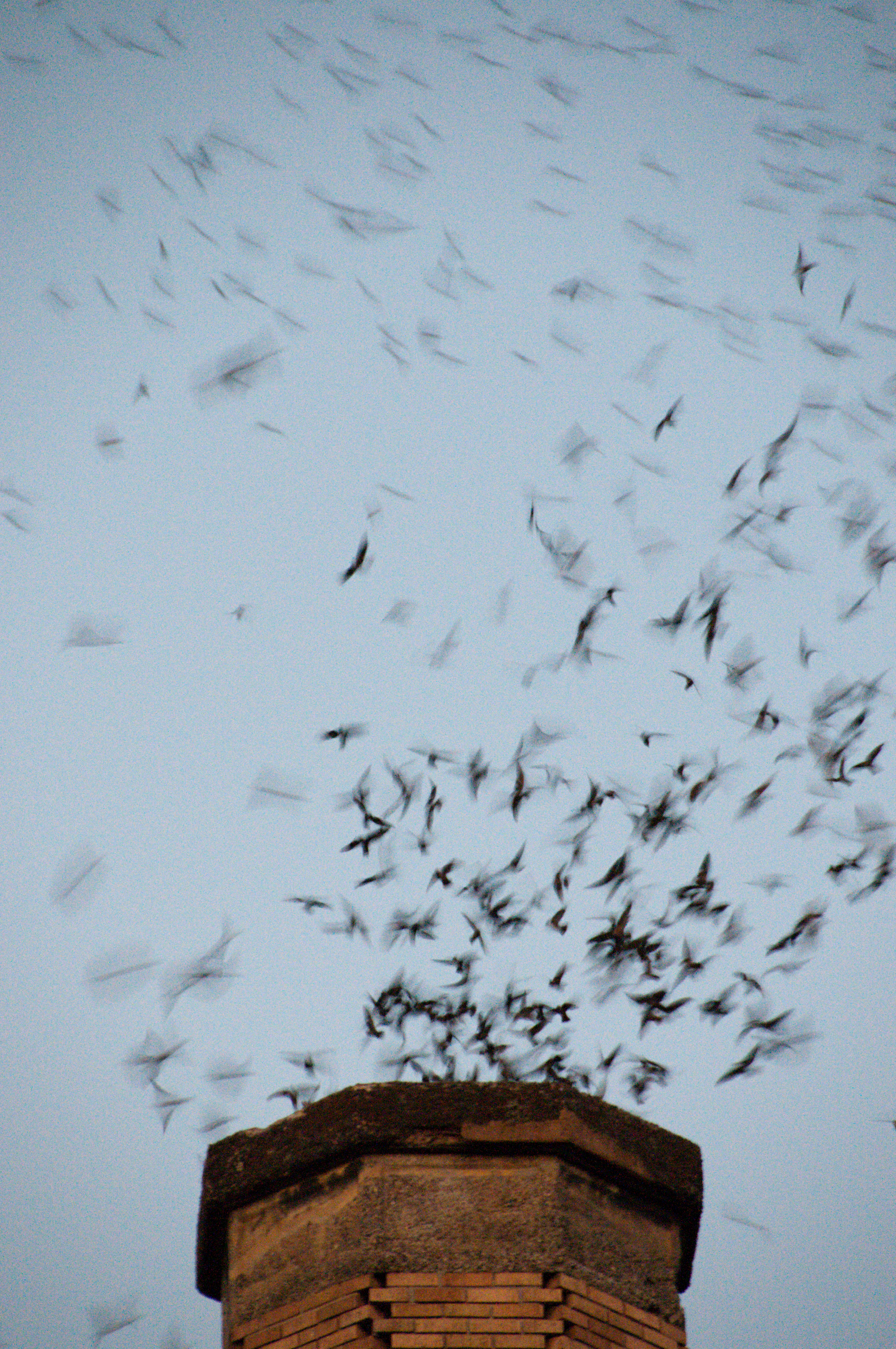
Vaux's swifts at Chapman Elementary in Portland

A migratory population of Vaux's swifts roost each Autumn in the old brick chimney of Chapman Elementary School in Northwest Portland, Oregon. They are locally and regionally known as "Chapman swifts," in part because packing thousands of birds into a brick chimney each evening is a visual treat that draws large crowds.

These birds should not be confused with the Chapman's swift of Brazil, Columbia, Ecuador and other nations in South America; who are a different species entirely. The Portland Oregon flock is North America's largest concentration of Vaux's swifts.

Every evening from mid-August to mid-October, thousands of Vaux's swifts gather in the sky over the school, then between sunset and dark, fly into a tall brick chimney to roost for the night. Thousands of birds flock in great living tornados, then funnel into the chimney. Estimates of 1,700 to 35,000 swifts have been reported in various years. Shortly after sunset, over a period of roughly 30 minutes, they fly into the top of the brick chimney (constructed c.1925) to roost on the interior surface until they depart at sunrise. The school is on the birds' migratory route to their wintering sites in southern Central America and Venezuela.

The swifts attract predators, such as owls, Peregrine falcons and Cooper's hawks, as well as hundreds to thousands of human spectators.

=== History ===
The birds began using the site in the early 1980s in response to the loss of much of their natural roosting habitat — old growth Douglas-fir and forest snags. Vaux's swifts prefer roosting in standing hollow trees.

To protect the swifts, the school stopped using its heating system during the weeks of roosting. Students and teachers wore sweaters and jackets, especially toward the end of September when classroom temperatures can drop to 50 to 60 °F (10 to 16 °C). Around 2003, the Audubon Society of Portland, school fundraisers and corporate sponsors donated $60,000 to $75,000 for an alternate school heating system which is independent of the brick chimney. The chimney is now maintained solely for the use of the birds.
