= Palm swift =

Palm swift is a common name that may refer to several species of bird in the family Apodidae, including:

- The Asian palm swift (Cypsiurus balasiensis), a widespread species of Asia
- The African palm swift (Cypsiurus parvus), a widespread species of sub-Saharan Africa, parts of the Arabian Peninsula, and the Gulf of Guinea islands
- The Malagasy palm swift (Cypsiurus gracilis), a species native to Madagascar and the Comoros
- The pygmy palm swift (Tachornis furcata), a species native to Colombia and Venezuela
- The fork-tailed palm swift (Tachornis squamata), a widespread species of the Neotropical realm
- The Antillean palm swift (Tachornis phoenicobia), a species native to the Greater Antilles
Palm swifts
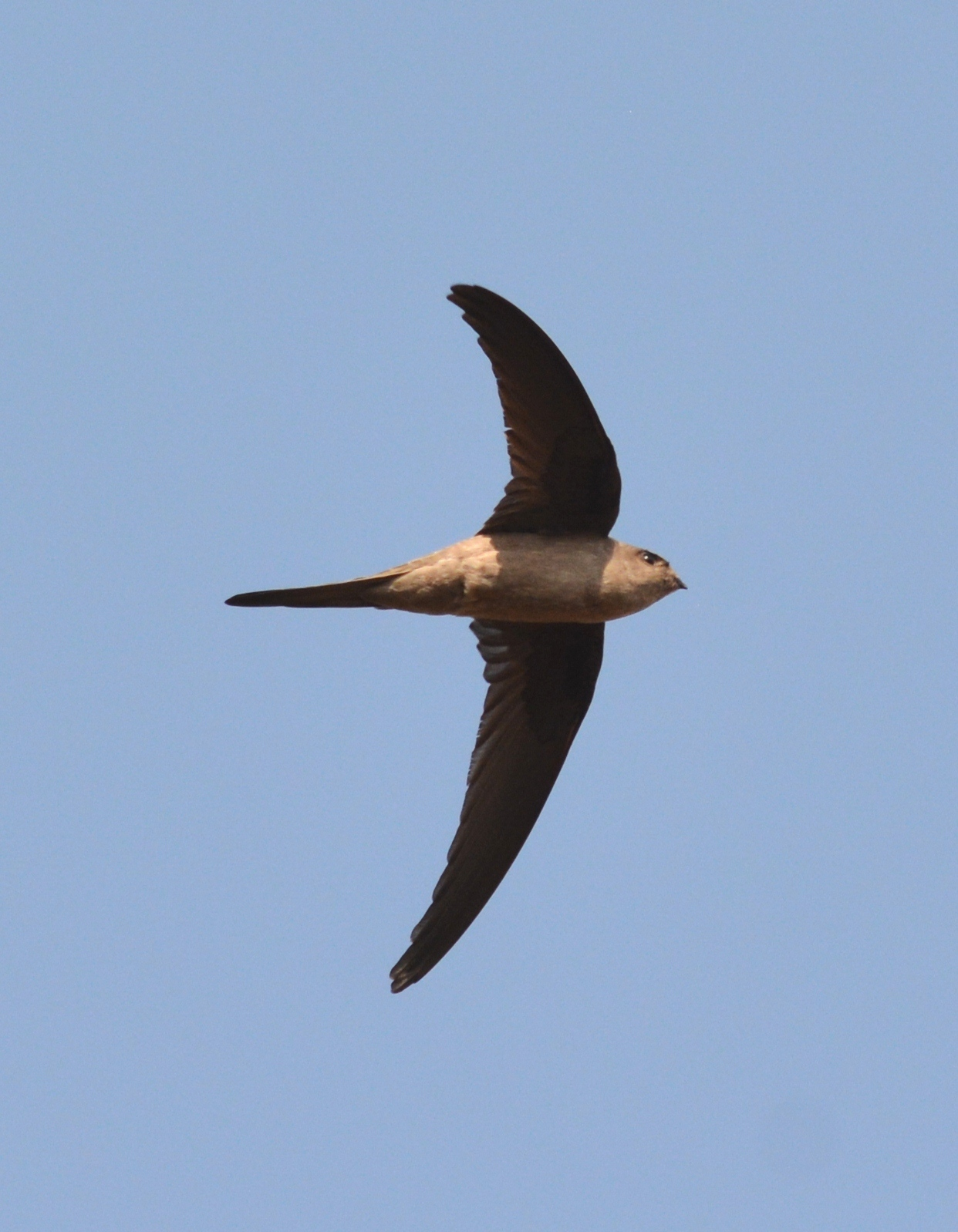
Asian palm swift (Cypsiurus balasiensis)

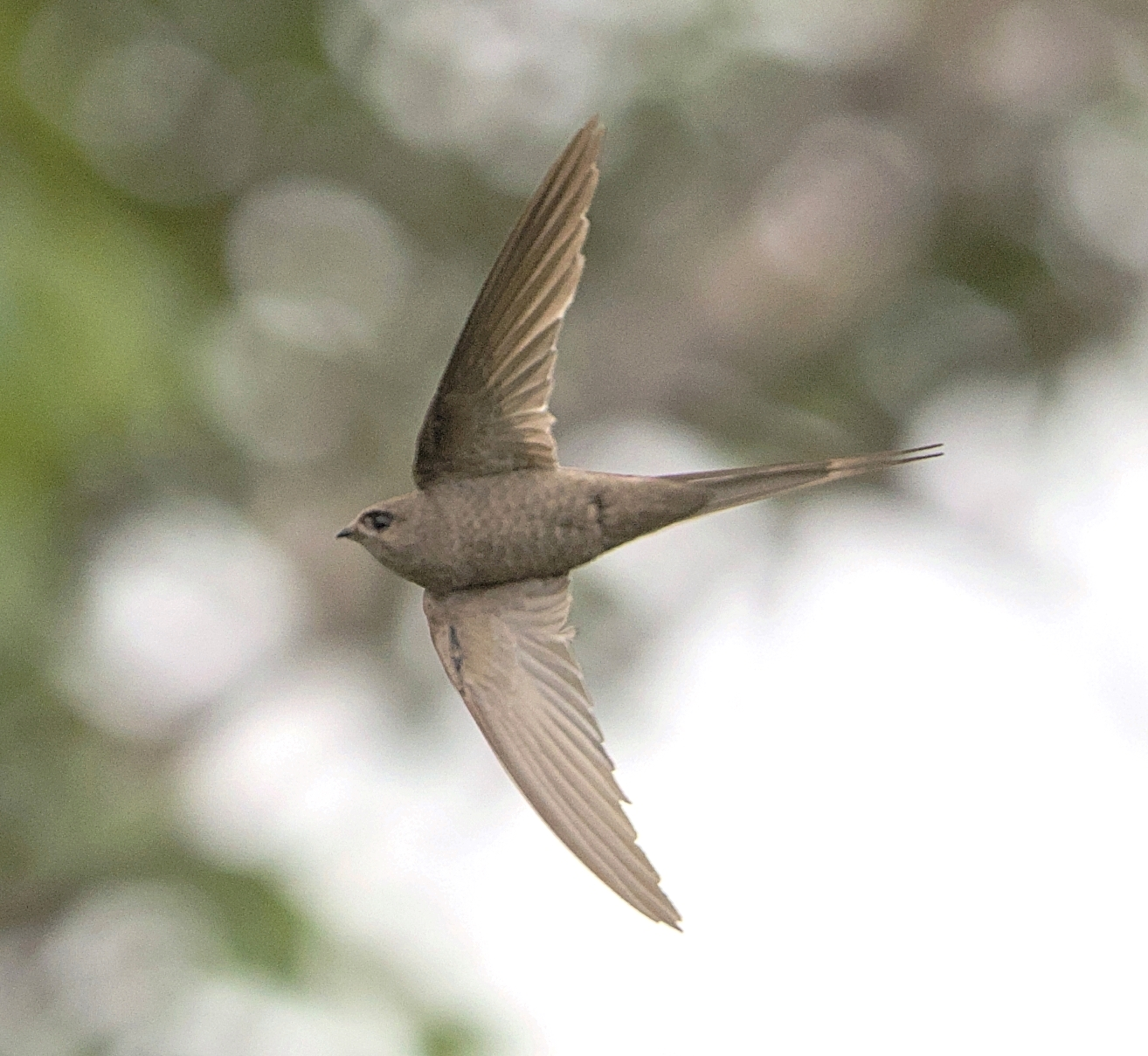
African palm swift (Cypsiurus parvus)

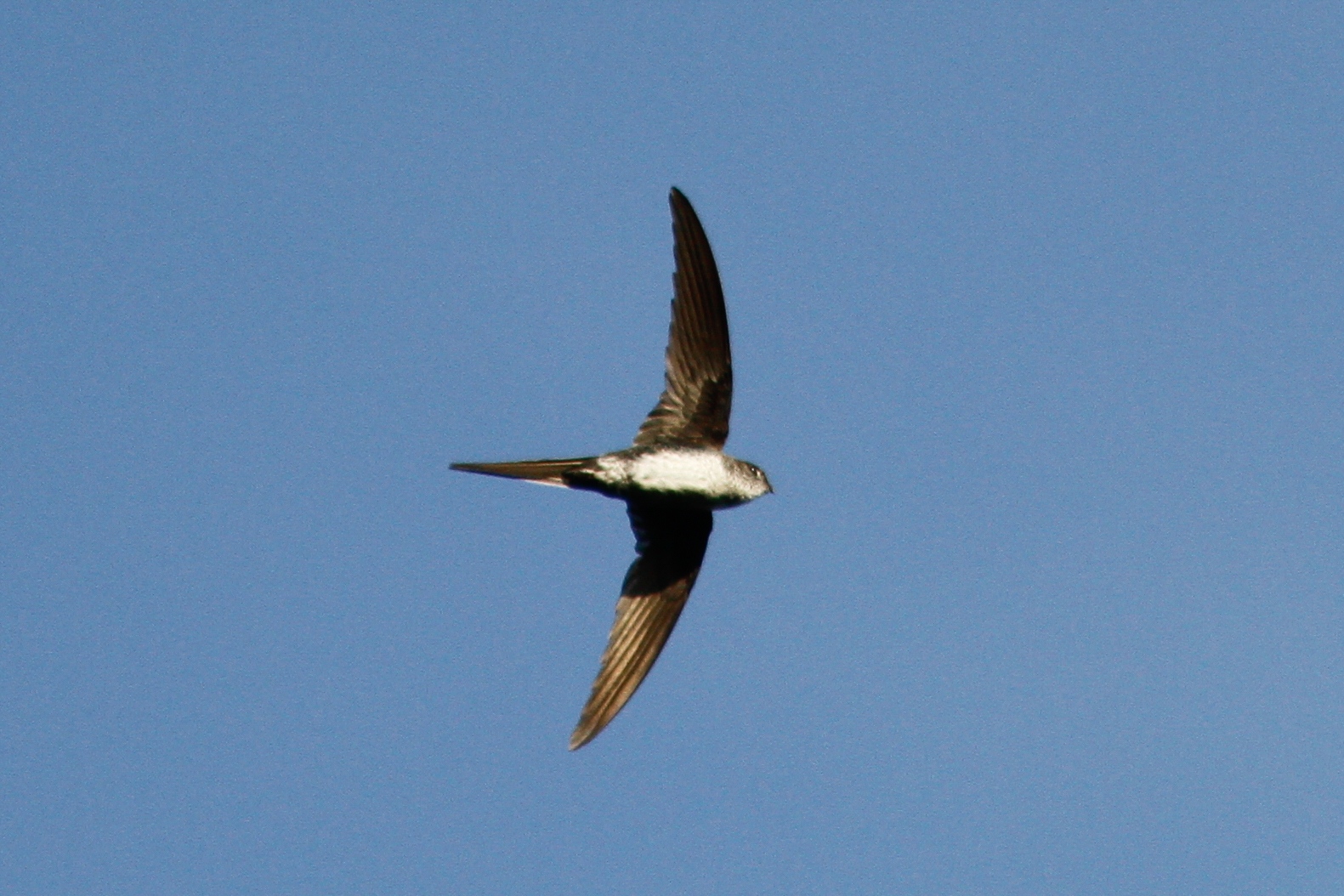
Fork-tailed palm swift (Tachornis squamata)

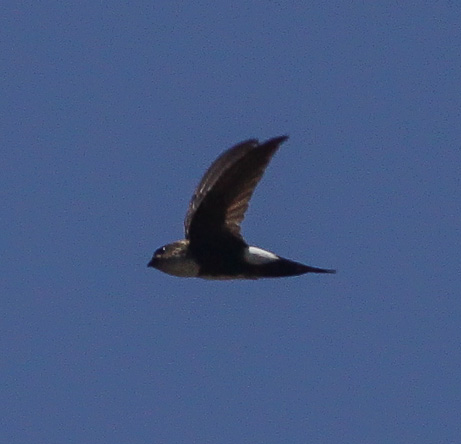
Antillean palm swift (Tachornis phoenicobia)
