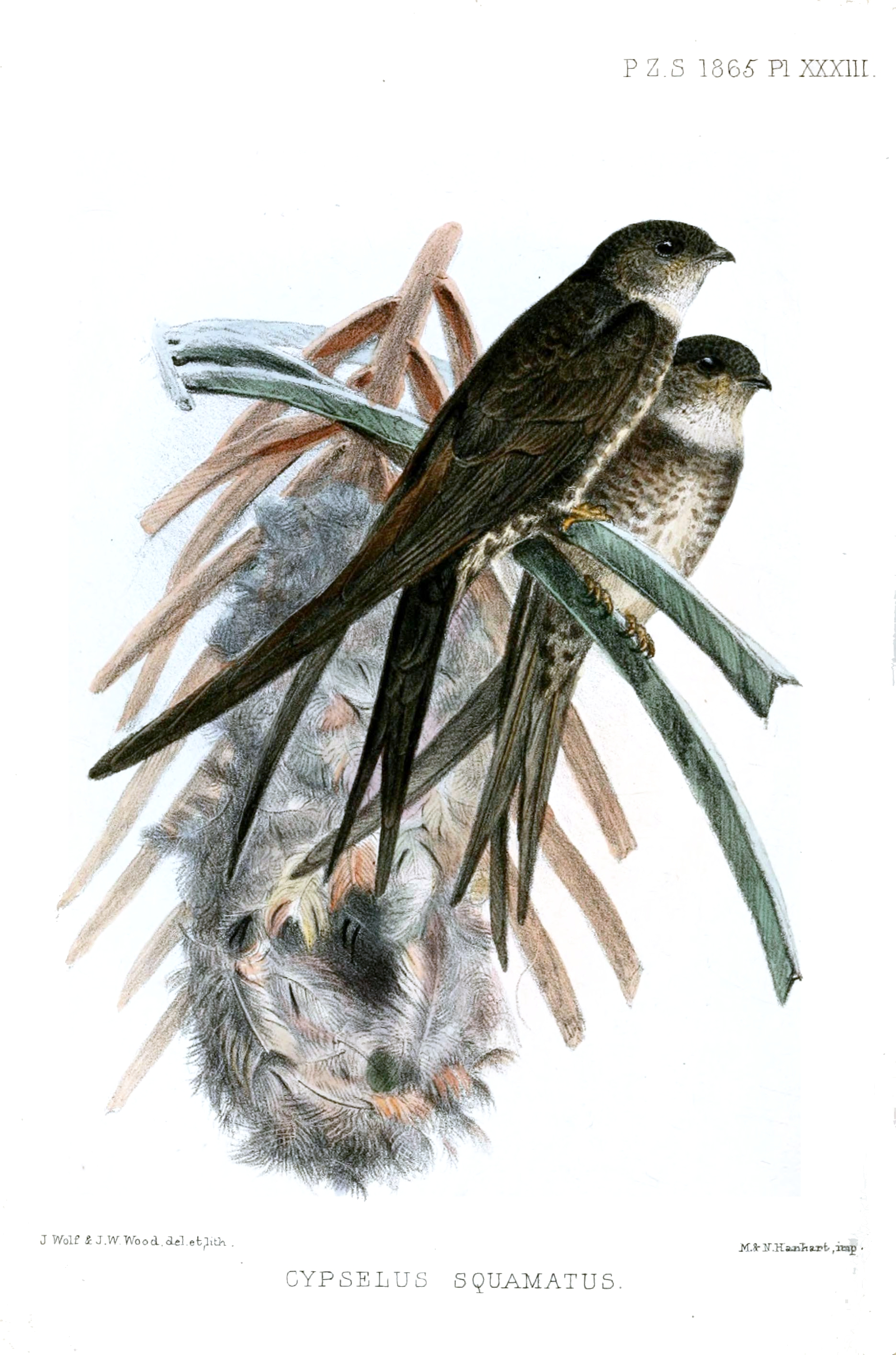

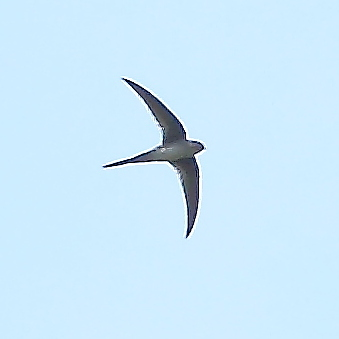
- Fork-tailed palm-swift flying over Apiacás, Mato Grosso state, Brazil

Conservation status
- Least Concern (IUCN 3.1)

Scientific classification
- Kingdom: Animalia
- Phylum: Chordata
- Class: Aves
- Clade: Strisores
- Order: Apodiformes
- Family: Apodidae
- Genus: Tachornis
- Species: T. squamata

Binomial name
- Tachornis squamata (Cassin, 1853)

= Fork-tailed palm swift =

Species of bird

The fork-tailed palm swift or Neotropical palm swift (Tachornis squamata) is a species of bird in subfamily Apodinae of the swift family Apodidae. It is found across most of northern South America and on Trinidad and Tobago.

== Taxonomy and systematics ==
The fork-tailed palm swift was for a time placed in genus Reinarda that was later merged into Tachornis. It has two subspecies, the nominate T. s. squamata and T. s. semota.

Despite the similarity in their names, it is in a different genus than the Old World Cypsiurus African, Malagasy, and Asian palm swifts.

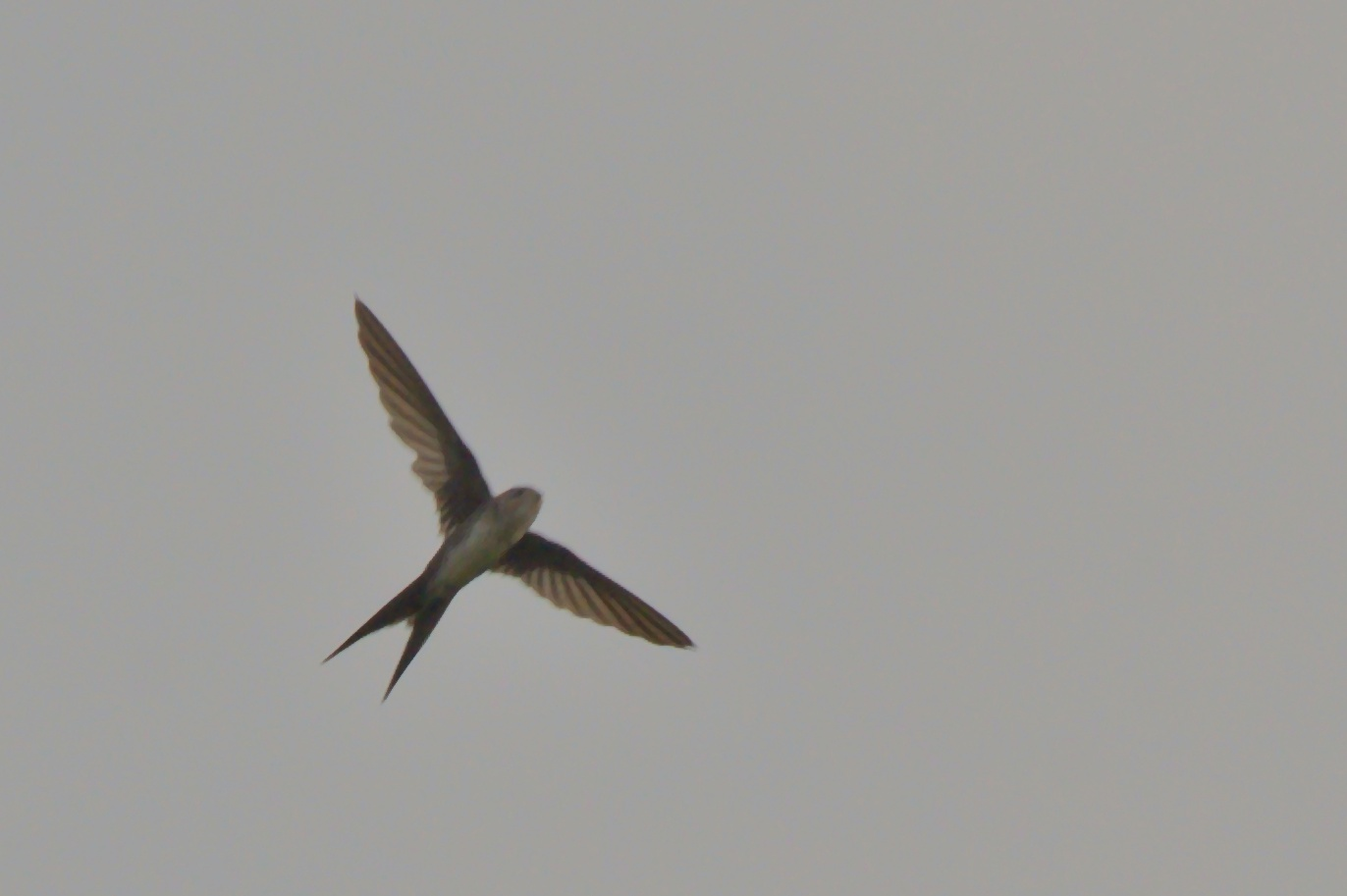
Fork-tailed palm-swift

== Description ==
The fork-tailed palm swift is about 13 cm (5.1 in) long and weighs 9 to 13.6 g (0.32 to 0.48 oz). It has long narrow wings and a long deeply forked tail. The sexes are alike. Adults of the nominate subspecies T. s. squamata have blackish brown upperparts with a slight greenish gloss and pale gray edges on the feathers; the rump is slightly paler. Their cheeks are grayish brown and the throat very pale brownish white with dusky mottling. The rest of their underparts are pale with light brown mottling that is sparsest in the center of the belly. Their undertail coverts are blackish brown with pale edges. Juveniles are similar to adults but have a buff tinge to the head and buffy edges to their upperparts' feathers.

Subspecies T. s. semota is darker overall than the nominate. It has blacker upperparts with less gray on the feathers' edges. Its underparts feathers are darker with very little pale edging and the undertail coverts are shining greenish black.

== Distribution and habitat ==
The nominate subspecies of fork-tailed palm swift is found in the Amazon Basin from northern Bolivia, eastern Peru, and eastern Ecuador through eastern Colombia and northwestern Brazil into southern and eastern Venezuela. T. s. semota is found on Trinidad, Tobago and in the Guianas and north central, northeastern, and eastern Brazil.

The fork-tailed palm swift is found in a variety of landscapes that have in common the presence of palm trees, especially moriche palms. They include moist and wet savannas, palm swamps, riparian forest, and urban areas. It is a lowland species, with maximum known elevation of about 1,000 m (3,300 ft).

== Behavior ==
=== Movement ===
The fork-tailed palm swift is a year-round resident throughout its range.

=== Feeding ===
Like all swifts, the fork-tailed palm swift is an aerial insectivore. It usually forages in small flocks of up to 10 of its species. Its diet is highly varied; it has been reported feeding on insects of at least nine orders. One study, however, found that in one area almost its entire diet was ants and termites, which hints that its diet varies geographically or seasonally.

=== Breeding ===
The fork-tailed palm swift's breeding season varies geographically, for example between April and June on Trinidad and from September to November in central Brazil. It nests only in palm trees, most frequently in Mauritia flexuosa palms though also in other species including introduced ones. The nest is a "disorderly, elongated clump of feathers" bound with saliva and having a bottom entrance; it hangs from a dangling dead palm frond. The swift collects feathers by pulling them from birds in flight; most are taken from pigeons and parrots though birds of at least 21 families have been targeted. The clutch size is three eggs; they are incubated for about 21 days.

=== Vocalization ===
The fork-tailed palm swift's flight calls have been described as "a trilling trrrrreeeee", "a buzzy d-z-z-z-z-z", and "a thin buzz, bzzzzzzz bzz bzzzzzz".

== Status ==
The IUCN has assessed the fork-tailed palm swift as being of Least Concern. It has an extremely large range, and though its population size is not known it is believed to be stable. No immediate threats have been identified. "This swift is adaptable to living around human habitations, and the planting of decorative palms provides nest sites for these birds."
