= Tachornis uranoceles =

Tachornis uranoceles Temporal range: Late Pleistocene

Scientific classification
- Kingdom: Animalia
- Phylum: Chordata
- Class: Aves
- Order: Apodiformes
- Family: Apodidae
- Genus: Tachornis
- Species: †T. uranoceles

Binomial name
- †Tachornis uranoceles Olson, 1982

Extinct species of bird

Tachornis uranoceles is an extinct species of palm swift in the extant genus Tachornis. Described by American ornithologist Storrs L. Olson in 1982, it lived in the late Pleistocene of Puerto Rico, where no modern palm swifts are resident. It is closely related to the extant Antillean palm swift (Tachornis phoenicobia).

== Discovery and description ==
Fossil remains later described as Tachornis uranoceles were first discovered in Blackbone Cave (known locally as Cueva del Infierno) in north-central Puerto Rico during a 1977 Smithsonian Institution fossil collecting expedition. The cave had been the subject of a previous expedition by Smithsonian staff in 1976 during which the sediment of the cave was screened through 1/8 in (3.2 mm) mesh, however, a pair of staffers returned to the site in 1977 and removed approximately 135 kg (298 lb) of previously screened dirt to be examined for smaller remains. The remains of T. uranoceles were recovered from the unconsolidated, unstratified sediment on the cave floor below what was likely once the roost of an extinct Puerto Rican barn owl (Tyto cavatica). These fossils were deposited in the cave as owl pellets during the late Pleistocene, with radiometric dating indicating an age of approximately 17,000–21,000 years before present. Other contemporaneous fossils found at the site included the bones of hummingbirds, bats, reptiles, and amphibians, some found still within intact pellets.

Storrs L. Olson, an American ornithologist who participated in the 1976–1977 expeditions, would describe the fossil remains as Tachornis uranoceles in 1982 after comparing them to the skeletons of the Antillean palm swift (Tachornis phoenicobia) and other swift species. The specific epithet uranoceles is derived from the Greek words ouranos, meaning "sky", and keles, meaning "racer". A right tarsometatarsus was designated as the holotype specimen, with the other remains attributed to T. uranoceles including eight carpometacarpi, three coracoids, a broken femur, five humeri, two tibiotarsi, six ulnae, and the anterior portion of a sternum. All specimens were deposited in the National Museum of Natural History.

== Ecology and extinction ==
Tachornis uranoceles was larger than its modern relatives, none of which are resident on Puerto Rico. Living members of the genus Tachornis are closely associated with palm trees, constructing their nests on the fronds. The closest living relative of T. uranoceles, the Antillean palm swift (T. phoenicobia), is native to nearby Cuba, Hispaniola, and Jamaica but does not breed on and only rarely vagrates to Puerto Rico. Olson speculated that T. uranoceles relied on a species of palm tree that became extinct or was greatly reduced in number due to climactic and habitat changes in Puerto Rico at the end of the Pleistocene, in turn leading to the extinction of T. uranoceles. Its extinction is not thought to be related to human activity.
