= Pygmy palm swift =

Conservation status
- Least Concern (IUCN 3.1)

Scientific classification
- Kingdom: Animalia
- Phylum: Chordata
- Class: Aves
- Clade: Strisores
- Order: Apodiformes
- Family: Apodidae
- Genus: Tachornis
- Species: T. furcata

Binomial name
- Tachornis furcata (Sutton, 1928)

Species of bird

The pygmy palm swift (Tachornis furcata), also known as the pygmy swift, is a species of bird in subfamily Apodinae of the swift family Apodidae. It is found in Colombia and Venezuela.

== Taxonomy and systematics ==
The pygmy palm swift was at times placed in the monotypic genus Micropanyptila. It was also previously lumped as a subspecies of what is now the fork-tailed palm swift (Tachornis squamata) in genus Reinarda. It has two subspecies, the nominate T. f. furcata and T. f. nigrodorsalis.

== Description ==
The pygmy palm swift is about 10 cm (3.9 in) long. It has long, thin, pointed wings and a long deeply forked tail. The sexes are alike. The nominate subspecies has entirely brown upperparts. Its whitish throat and upper belly are separated by a brown band, and the lower belly and undertail coverts are brown. Subspecies T. f. nigrodorsalis has blacker upperparts than the nominate and its throat is whiter.

== Distribution and habitat ==
The nominate subspecies of pygmy palm swift is found in northeastern Colombia's Norte de Santander Department and the adjoining southern part of Venezuela's Maracaibo Basin. T. f. nigrodorsalis is found in the western part of the Maracaibo Basin. The species primarily inhabits lowland tropical evergreen forest, secondary forest, and regrowing scrublands. It is also found in cultivated and other open areas as long as they contain palm trees.

== Behavior ==
=== Movement ===
The pygmy palm swift is believed to be a year-round resident throughout its range.

=== Feeding ===
Like all swifts, the pygmy palm swift is an aerial insectivore, but details of its diet are lacking. It usually forages in small flocks.

=== Breeding ===
The pygmy palm swift's breeding season has not been fully defined but could be as long as January to July. It makes a bag nest, mostly of feathers glued together with saliva, and hanging from the underside of a drooping palm frond. The clutch size, incubation period, and time to fledging are not known.

=== Vocalization ===
As of late 2022 xeno-canto had no recordings of pygmy palm swift vocalizations and the Cornell Lab of Ornithology's Macaulay Library only one. The species' call is described as "buzzy 'bee-beez-beez-beez-be-be-be', accelerating and trailing off".

== Status ==
The IUCN has assessed the pygmy palm swift as being of Least Concern, though it has a limited range and its population (of unknown size) is believed to be decreasing. No immediate threats have been identified. "[I]t appears that it is not a rare bird and currently does not require special status or conservation efforts."
