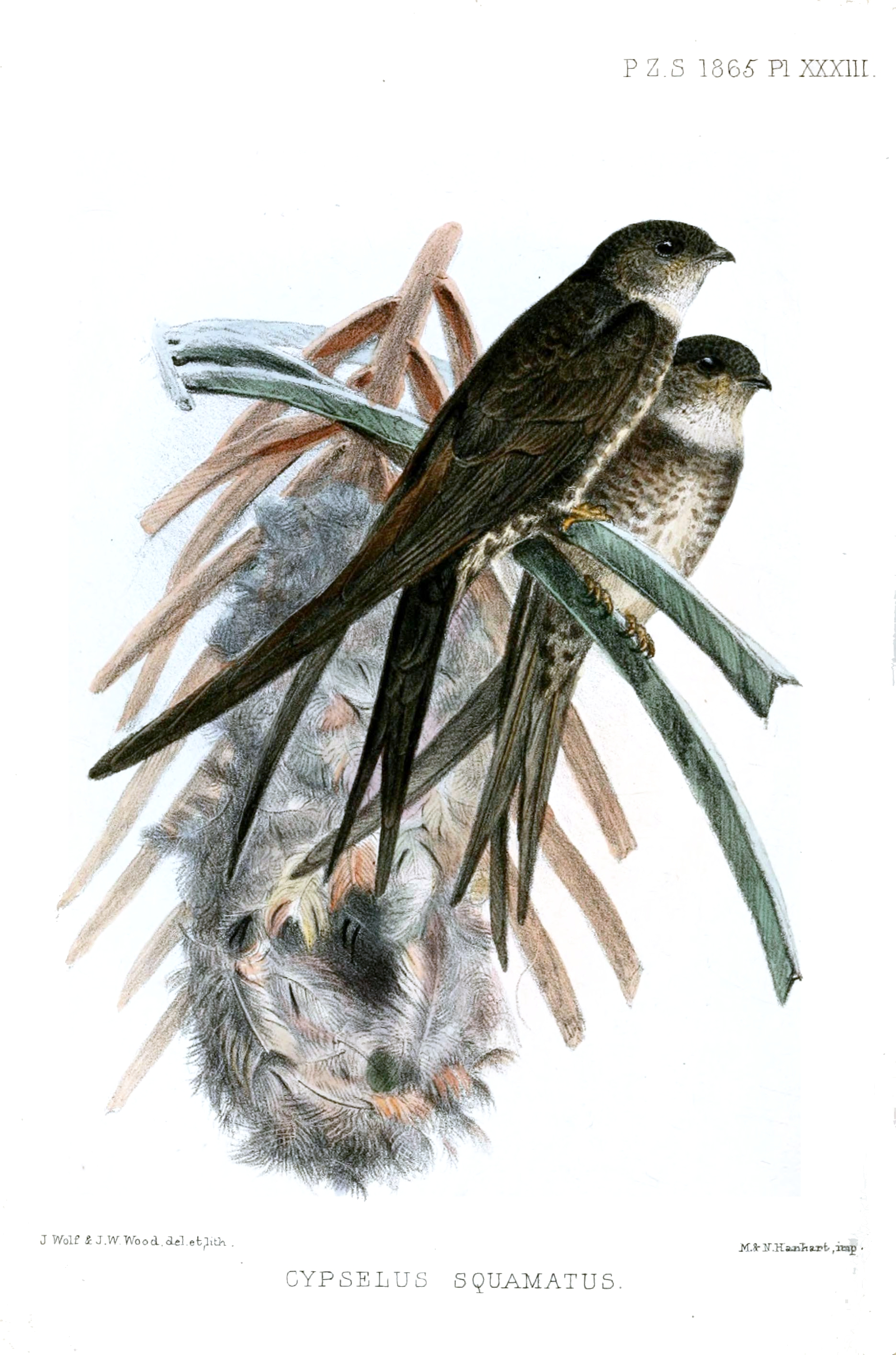
- Fork-tailed palm swift (Tachornis squamata)

Scientific classification
- Kingdom: Animalia
- Phylum: Chordata
- Class: Aves
- Order: Apodiformes
- Family: Apodidae
- Tribe: Apodini
- Genus: Tachornis; Gosse, 1847

Type species
- Tachornis phoenicobia Gosse, 1847

Species
- T. furcata (Sutton, 1928); T. squamata (Cassin, 1853); T. phoenicobia Gosse, 1847; †T. uranoceles Olson, 1982

= Tachornis =

Tachornis Temporal range: Late Pleistocene–present

Genus of birds

Tachornis is a genus of swift in the family Apodidae. It contains the following species:

- Pygmy palm swift (Tachornis furcata)
- Fork-tailed palm swift (Tachornis squamata)
- Antillean palm swift (Tachornis phoenicobia)
- Tachornis uranoceles (fossil; Late Pleistocene of Puerto Rico)

These birds are found in the Neotropics, ranging from the Caribbean to South America. They are characterized by their small size and deeply forked tails.

The name Tachornis derives from the Greek words tachys or takhus, meaning "fast", and ornis, meaning "bird".
