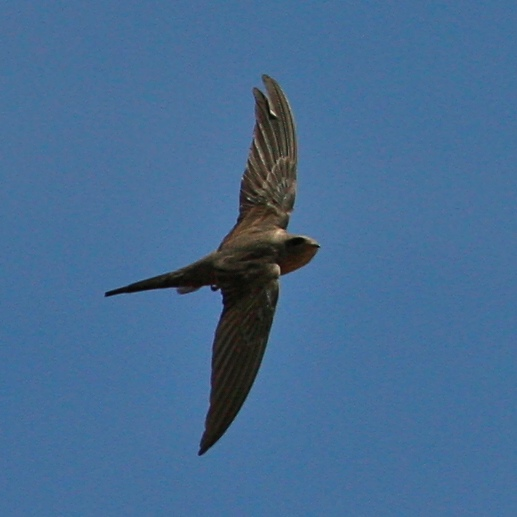
- African palm swift

Scientific classification
- Kingdom: Animalia
- Phylum: Chordata
- Class: Aves
- Order: Apodiformes
- Family: Apodidae
- Tribe: Apodini
- Genus: Cypsiurus; Lesson, 1843

Type species
- Cypselus ambrosiacus Temminck, 1828

Species
- C. balasiensis (Gray, 1829); C. parvus (Lichtenstein, 1823); C. gracilis (Sharpe, 1871)

= Cypsiurus =

Genus of birds

Cypsiurus is a genus of birds in the swift family Apodidae. It includes three species, which were formerly considered to be conspecific due to their similarity.

== Species ==
Genus Cypsiurus – Lesson, 1843 – three species
Common name	Scientific name and subspecies	Range	IUCN status and estimated population
Asian palm swift	Cypsiurus balasiensis (Gray, 1829) Four subspecies: C. b. balasiensis (Gray, 1829); C. b. bartelsorum Brooke, 1972; C. b. infumatus (Sclater, 1866); C. b. pallidior (McGregor, 1905)	Widespread throughout Asia	LC Population unknown
African palm swift	Cypsiurus parvus (Lichtenstein, 1823) Six subspecies: C. p. brachypterus (Reichenow, 1903); C. p. celer Clancey, 1983; C. p. hyphaenes Brooke, 1972; C. p. laemostigma (Reichenow, 1905); C. p. myochrous (Reichenow, 1886); C. p. parvus (Lichtenstein, 1823)	Widespread throughout Africa	LC Population unknown
Malagasy palm swift	Cypsiurus gracilis (Sharpe, 1871) Two subspecies: C. g. gracilis (Sharpe, 1871); C. g. griveaudi Benson, 1960	Madagascar and the Comoros	LC Population unknown

== Description ==
They have mainly pale brown plumage and long swept-back wings that resemble a crescent or a boomerang. The body is slender, and the tail is long and deeply forked, although it is usually held closed. The sexes are similar, and young birds differ from adults mainly in their shorter tails. Palm swifts have very short legs which they use only for clinging to vertical surfaces, since swifts never settle voluntarily on the ground.

These swifts spend most of their lives in the air, living on flying insects. Palm swifts often feed near the ground, and they drink on the wing.
