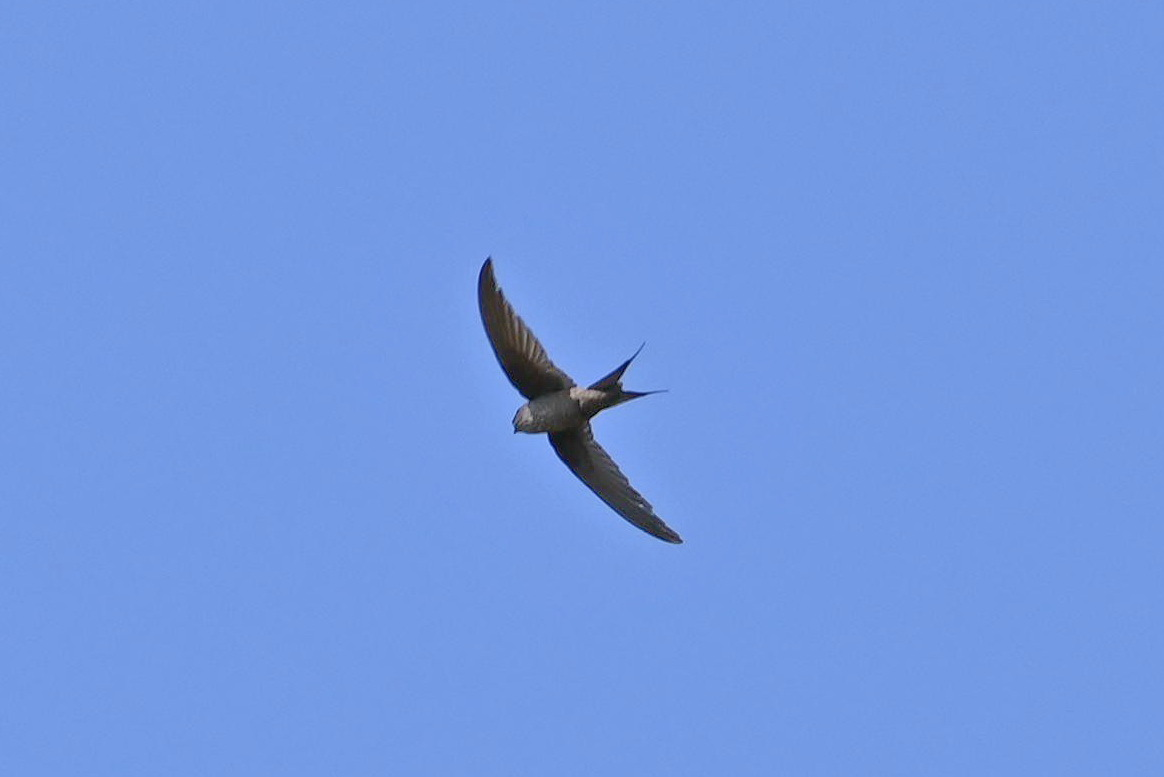

Conservation status
- Least Concern (IUCN 3.1)

Scientific classification
- Kingdom: Animalia
- Phylum: Chordata
- Class: Aves
- Clade: Strisores
- Order: Apodiformes
- Family: Apodidae
- Genus: Cypsiurus
- Species: C. gracilis

Binomial name
- Cypsiurus gracilis (Sharpe, 1871)
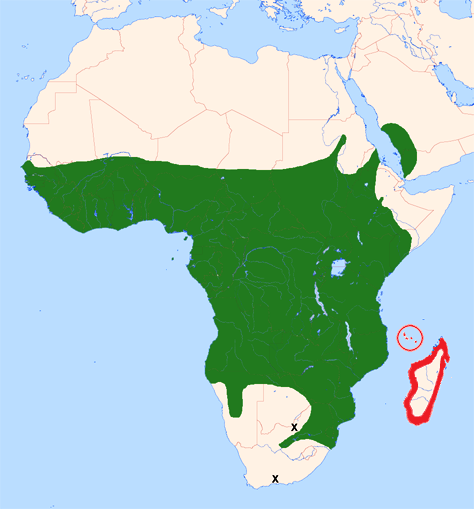
- range of C. gracilis range of C. parvus

= Malagasy palm swift =

Species of bird

The Malagasy palm swift (Cypsiurus gracilis) is a small swift in the family Apodidae. It is very similar to the African palm swift, Cypsiurus parvus, with which it was formerly considered conspecific. It was split based on differences in vocalizations and plumage coloration.

== Distribution ==
The Malagasy palm swift is native to Madagascar and Comoros.
