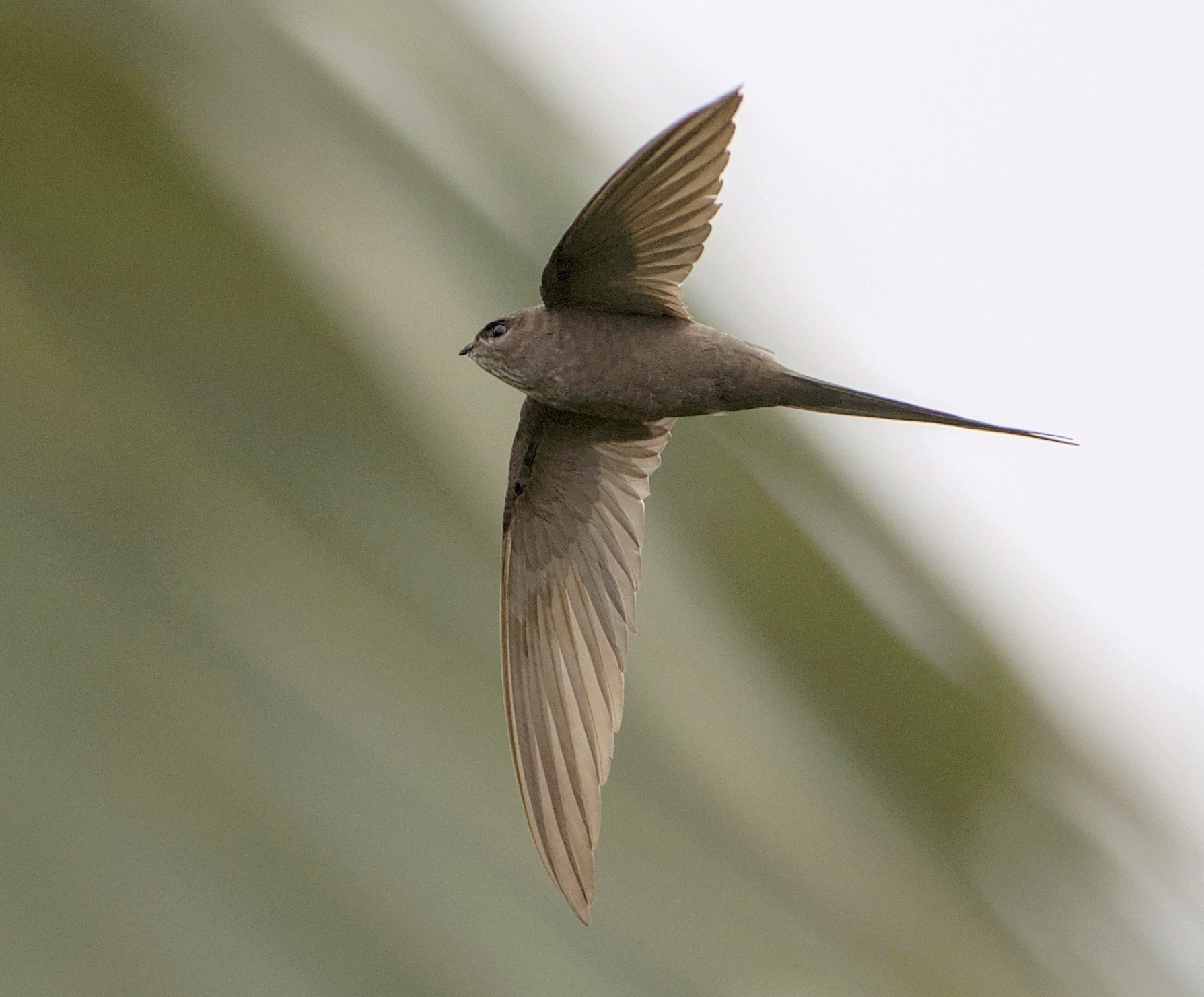
- At fan palms in the Kruger National Park

Conservation status
- Least Concern (IUCN 3.1)

Scientific classification
- Kingdom: Animalia
- Phylum: Chordata
- Class: Aves
- Order: Apodiformes
- Family: Apodidae
- Genus: Cypsiurus
- Species: C. parvus

Binomial name
- Cypsiurus parvus (Lichtenstein, MHC, 1823)
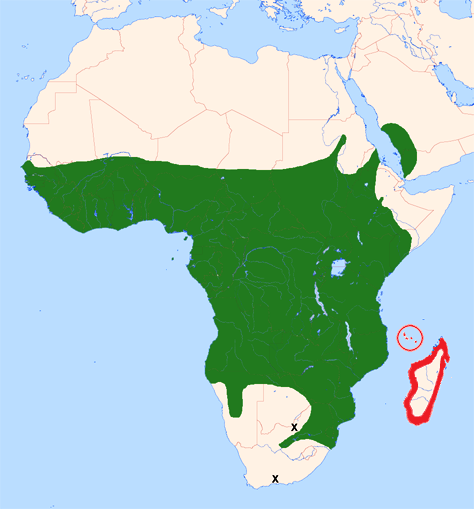
- range of C. parvus range of C. gracilis X: Isolated / expanding occurrence of C. parvus

= African palm swift =

Species of bird

The African palm swift (Cypsiurus parvus) is a small swift. It is very similar to the Asian palm swift, Cypsiurus balasiensis, and was formerly considered to be the same species. The Malagasy palm swift was also recently split from this species. This is a common species with a very wide distribution which faces no obvious threats and may be increasing in numbers as a result of the cultivation of the exotic Washington palm, so the International Union for Conservation of Nature has rated its conservation status as being of "least concern".

== Description ==
This 16 cm long species is mainly pale brown in colour. It has long swept-back wings that resemble a crescent or a boomerang. The body is slender, and the tail is long and deeply forked, although it is usually held closed. The call is a loud, shrill scream. Sexes are similar, and young birds differ mainly in their shorter tails. Palm swifts have very short legs which they use only for clinging to vertical surfaces, since swifts never settle voluntarily on the ground.

== Distribution ==
The African palm swift is native to Angola, Benin, Botswana, Burkina Faso, Burundi, Cameroon, Central African Republic, Chad, Congo, Democratic Republic of the Congo, Equatorial Guinea, Eritrea, Eswatini, Ethiopia, Gabon, The Gambia, Ghana, Guinea, Guinea-Bissau, Ivory Coast, Kenya, Liberia, Malawi, Mali, Mauritania, Mayotte, Mozambique, Namibia, Niger, Nigeria, Rwanda, São Tomé and Príncipe, Saudi Arabia, Senegal, Sierra Leone, Somalia, South Africa, South Sudan, Sudan, Tanzania, Togo, Uganda, Yemen, Zambia and Zimbabwe.

== Ecology ==
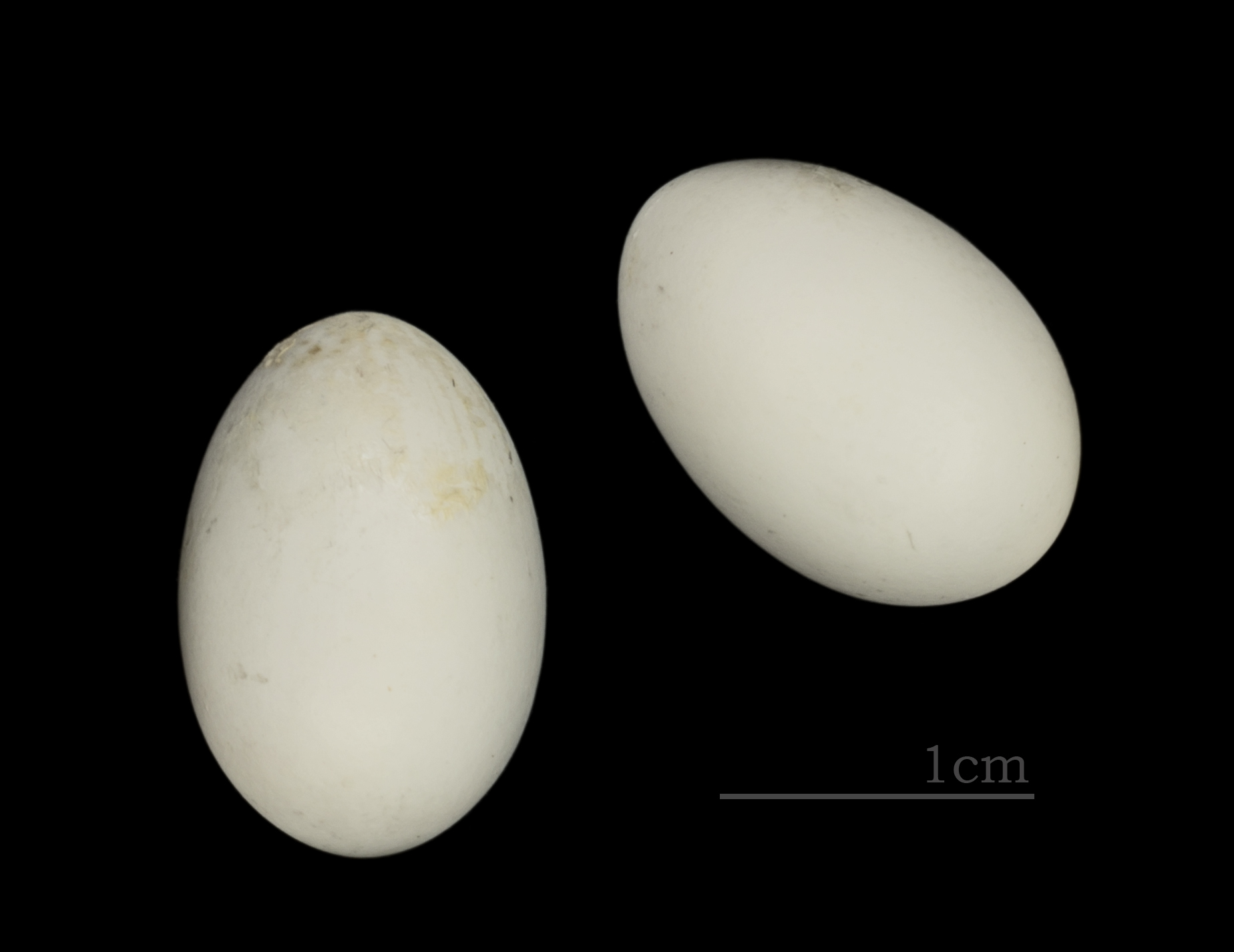
Eggs of Cypsiurus parvus MHNT

These swifts spend most of their lives in the air, living on the insects they catch in their beaks. Palm swifts often feed near the ground. They drink on the wing. It is a common resident breeder in tropical Africa. The down and feather nest is glued to the underside of a palm frond with saliva, which is also used to secure the usually two eggs. This is a fast-flying bird of open country, which is strongly associated with oil palms but is also found in wooded savannah, thornbush and cultivated land.
