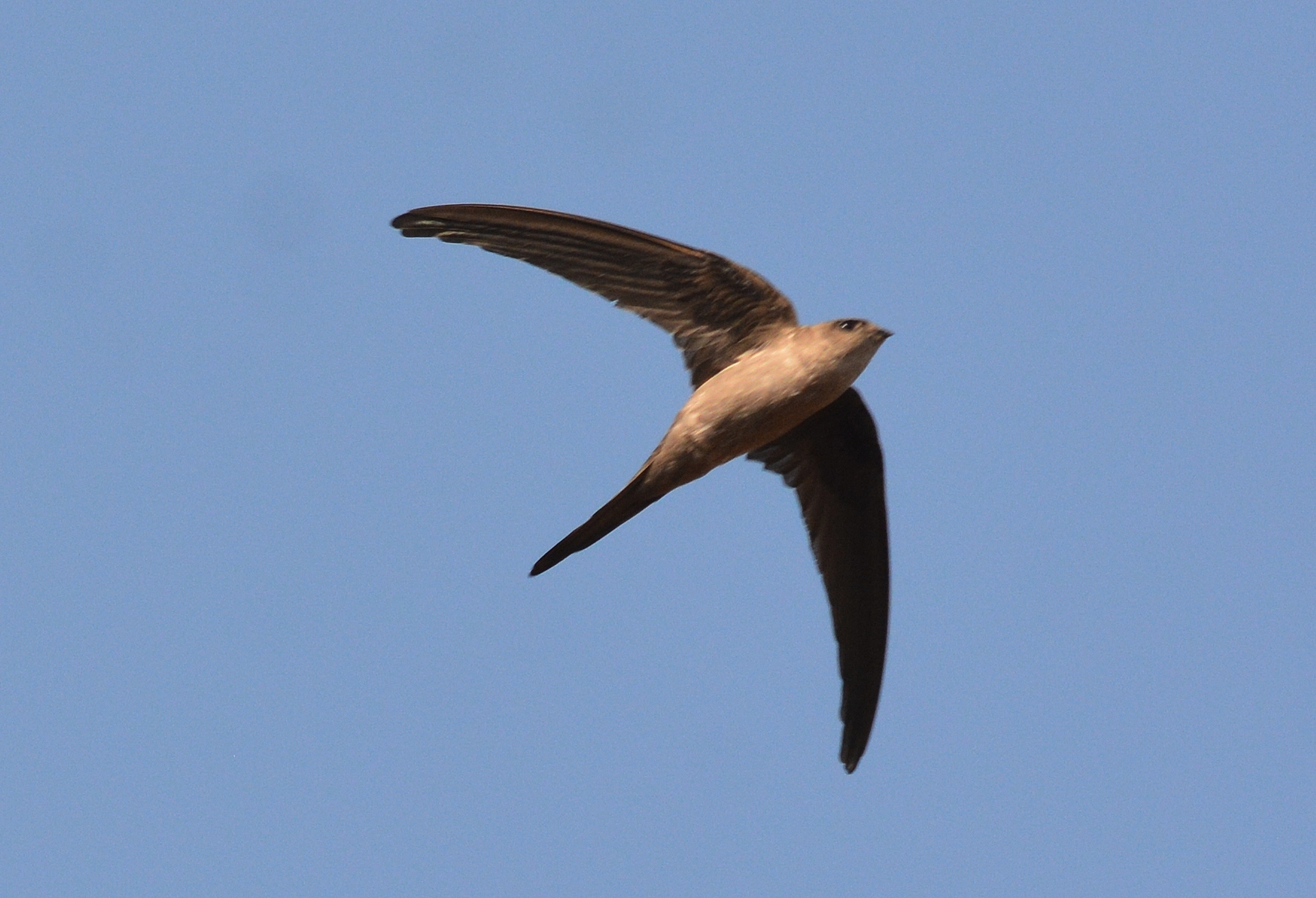

Conservation status
- Least Concern (IUCN 3.1)

Scientific classification
- Kingdom: Animalia
- Phylum: Chordata
- Class: Aves
- Clade: Strisores
- Order: Apodiformes
- Family: Apodidae
- Genus: Cypsiurus
- Species: C. balasiensis

Binomial name
- Cypsiurus balasiensis (J.E. Gray, 1829)

= Asian palm swift =

Species of bird

The Asian palm swift (Cypsiurus balasiensis) is a small swift. It is very similar to the African palm swift, Cypsiurus parvus, and was formerly considered to be the same species.

It is a common resident breeder in tropical Asia from India to the Philippines. The down and feather nest is glued to the underside of a palm leaf with saliva, which is also used to secure the usually two or three eggs. This is a bird of open country and cultivation, which is strongly associated with oil palms.

This 13 cm long species is mainly pale brown in colour. It has long swept-back wings that resemble a crescent or a boomerang. The body is slender, and the tail is long and deeply forked, although it is usually held closed. The call is a loud shrill scream.

Sexes are similar, and young birds differ from adults mainly in their shorter tails. Asian palm swift has very short legs which it uses only for clinging to vertical surfaces, since swifts never settle voluntarily on the ground.

These swifts spend most of their lives in the air, living on the insects they catch in their beaks. Asian palm swifts often feed near the ground, and they drink on the wing.

== Gallery ==
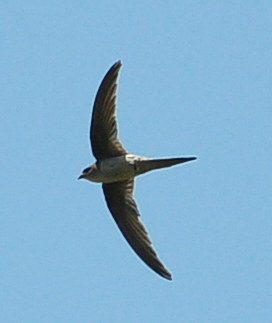
Asian palm swift flying above the beach at a resort in Puducherry, India

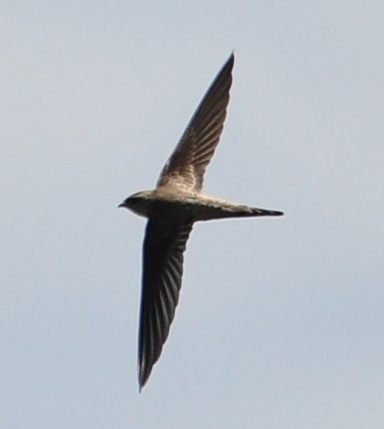
Asian palm swift upper
