= George Miksch Sutton =

American ornithologist and bird artist

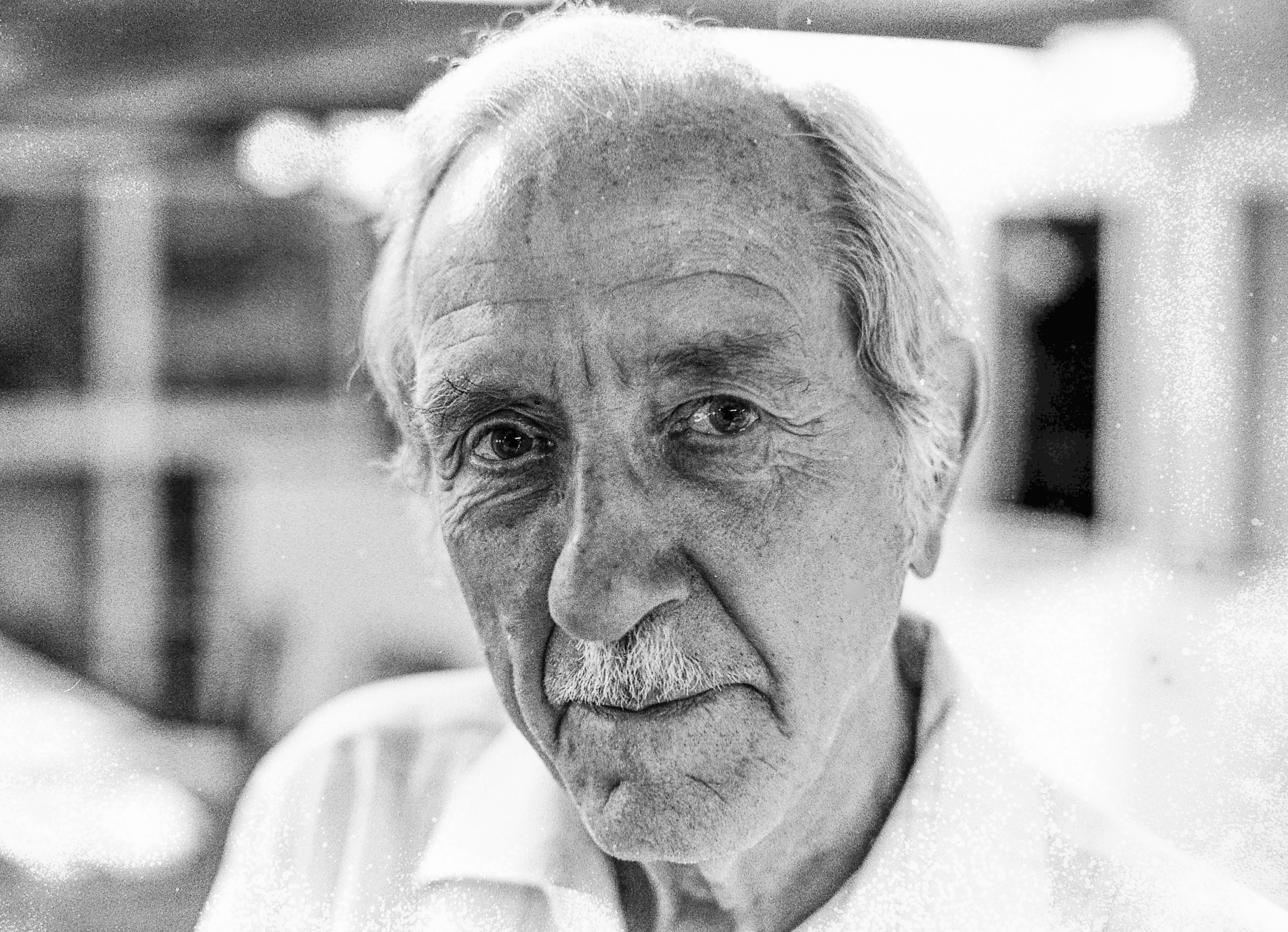
George M. Sutton in 1972

George Miksch Sutton (May 16, 1898, Bethany, Nebraska – December 7, 1982) was an American ornithologist and bird artist. He published numerous technical papers in ornithology as well as more popular works illustrated with his own art. His early artistic work was inspired and tutored by Louis Agassiz Fuertes. In 1931, he was the first ornithologist to find the eggs of the Harris's sparrow, one of the last North American birds to have its nest and eggs described. In 1935, he was part of the team of Arthur Augustus Allen during an expedition to the Singer Tract in Louisiana to make sketches of ivory-billed woodpecker. He did extensive field work in the Arctic (including Iceland), Oklahoma, Labrador, and Mexico. He received his doctorate from Cornell University and held academic posts at the University of Michigan and the University of Oklahoma, Norman. The George M. Sutton Avian Research Center in Bartlesville, Oklahoma was named after him.

== Bibliography ==
His book-length works include:

- Mexican Birds: First Impressions (1951)
- Iceland Summer (1961)
- Oklahoma Birds (1967)
- High Arctic (1971)
- At a Bend in a Mexican River (1972)
- Portraits of Mexican Birds (1975)
- Fifty Common Birds of Oklahoma (1977)
- To a Young Bird Artist (1979)

Books illustrated by Sutton include:

- American Bird Biographies (1934); author – Arthur A. Allen, PhD; publisher – Comstock Publishing Company, Inc.; detail – 10 color plates and 10 wash drawings
- The Golden Plover and Other Birds (1939); author – Arthur A. Allen, PhD; publisher – Comstock Publishing Company, Inc.; detail – 7 color plates
- Birds of Western Pennsylvania (1940); author - W. E. Clyde Todd; publisher - University of Pittsburgh Press; detail - 23 color plates showing 81 species, and 60 pen-and-ink drawings.

He also drew the burrowing owl that is now used as the logo for the Nebraska Ornithologists' Union.
