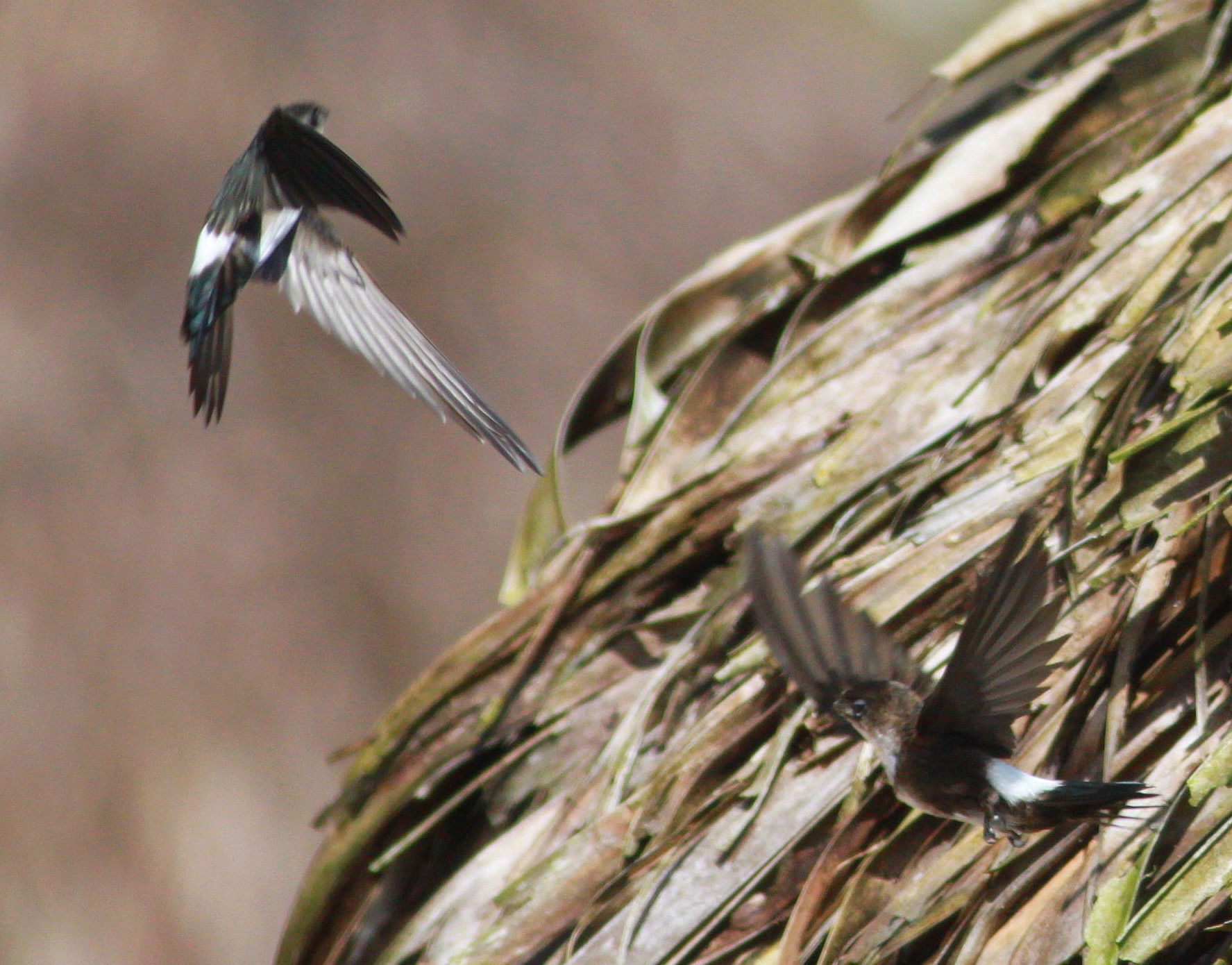

Conservation status
- Least Concern (IUCN 3.1)

Scientific classification
- Kingdom: Animalia
- Phylum: Chordata
- Class: Aves
- Order: Apodiformes
- Family: Apodidae
- Genus: Tachornis
- Species: T. phoenicobia

Binomial name
- Tachornis phoenicobia Gosse, 1847

= Antillean palm swift =

Species of bird

The Antillean palm swift (Tachornis phoenicobia) is a species of bird in subfamily Apodinae of the swift family Apodidae. It is found on the Caribbean islands of Cuba, Jamaica, and Hispaniola (shared by the Dominican Republic and Haiti).

== Taxonomy and systematics ==
The Antillean palm swift has two subspecies: the nominate T. p. phoenicobia Gosse, 1847, and T. p. iradii (Lembeye, 1850).

== Description ==
The Antillean palm swift is 9 to 11 cm (3.5 to 4.3 in) long and weighs about 9 to 11 g (0.32 to 0.39 oz). It has long narrow wings and a medium length forked tail. The sexes are alike. Adults of the nominate subspecies have a dark sooty brown crown and nape. Their back, a narrow center strip of the rump, uppertail coverts, and tail are sooty black to black. The sides of their rump are white. Their wings are sooty blackish with pale edges on the flight feathers. Most of their face is grayish brown. Their underparts are mostly dull white; their flanks, a narrow band across the breast, and undertail coverts are dark sooty brown. Immatures are similar to adults, but their underparts are an even duller white, and the flanks and undertail coverts a paler sooty brown.

The subspecies T. p. iradii is somewhat larger than the nominate, and has a more deeply forked tail. Its back is more sooty than black, its face has more extensive grayish brown, and its flanks are a paler sooty brown.

== Distribution and habitat ==
The nominate subspecies of Antillean palm swift is found on Jamaica, Hispaniola, and some small islands off the latter's coast. T. p. iradii is found on mainland Cuba and Isla de la Juventud. The species has been documented as a vagrant in Florida and there are sight records from Puerto Rico, the Cayman Islands, Inagua in The Bahamas, and the Turks and Caicos Islands. The Antillean palm swift is seen over dry grassy areas that have patches of palms, scrublands, forest, and suburban and urban areas. In elevation, it ranges as high as 1,700 m (5,600 ft) on Hispaniola and 1,200 m (3,900 ft) on Jamaica.

== Behavior ==
=== Movement ===
The Antillean palm swift is a year-round resident throughout its range, though individuals have wandered outside it.

=== Feeding ===
Like all swifts, the Antillean palm swift is an aerial insectivore. It forages low to the ground, usually over vegetation, and usually in small flocks of its species. It sometimes forages with swallows. Details of its diet are lacking.

=== Breeding ===
The Antillean palm swift's breeding season on Cuba is May to July, and on Hispaniola, from March to May. It makes a hanging pouch nest of plant fibers and feathers glued together with saliva and hung on the outside of a dead drooping palm frond. It nests in small colonies. The clutch size is two to five; both parents incubate the eggs and care for nestlings.

=== Vocalization ===
The Antillean palm swift's flight call is described as "noisy...an almost constant, weak, twittering, tooee-tooee".

== Status ==
The IUCN has assessed the Antillean palm swift as being of Least Concern. It has a large range, and though its population size is not known it is believed to be stable. No immediate threats have been identified. "This swift is adaptable to living around human habitations, and the planting of decorative palms provides nest sites for these birds."
