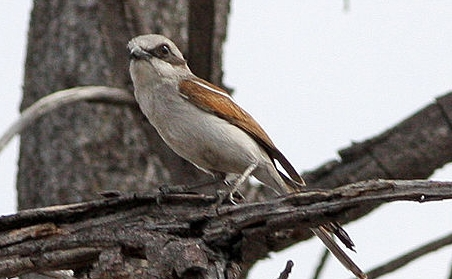

Conservation status
- Least Concern (IUCN 3.1)

Scientific classification
- Kingdom: Animalia
- Phylum: Chordata
- Class: Aves
- Order: Passeriformes
- Family: Laniidae
- Genus: Lanius
- Species: L. souzae

Binomial name
- Lanius souzae Barbosa du Bocage, 1878

= Souza's shrike =

Species of bird

Souza's shrike (Lanius souzae) is a species of passerine bird in the family Laniidae, the shrikes. It is thought to be a mainly sedentary species that is found in miombo woodland in southern central Africa. It was named after Portuguese zoologist José Augusto de Sousa (1836–1889).

== Taxonomy ==
Souza's shrike was first formally described in 1878 by the Portuguese zoologist José Vicente Barbosa du Bocage, with its type locality given as Caconda in Angola.

Within the genus Lanius, Souza's shrike has been found to be most closely related to the Southern fiscal (L. collaris), more closely related to that species than the Northern fiscal (L. humeralis), making the fiscal shrike (L. collaris) sensu lato paraphyletic. Souza's shrike and the Southern fiscal appear to have speciated from one another 3.7 million years ago. The genus Lanius, of which Souza's shrike is a member, is classified within the family Laniidae, which sits within the superfamily Corvoidea, part of the clade Corvides in the suborder Passeri of the order Passeriformes.

=== Subspecies ===
Souza's shrike has three recognised subspecies:

- Lanius souzae souzae Barbosa du Bocage. 1878 (southeastern Gabon to southern Republic of Congo, southern Democratic Republic of the Congo, northern Zambia and Angola)
- Lanius souzae burigi J. P. Chapin, 1950 (Northwestern Tanzania to eastern Zambia, eastern Rwanda and Burundi)
- Lanius souzae tacitus Clancey, 1970 (southeastern Angola to northern Namibia, southern Zambia, Malawi and western Mozambique)

== Etymology ==
Souza's shrike belongs to the genus Lanius. This name is derived from the Latin word for "butcher", and some shrikes are known colloquially as "butcherbirds" for their habit of storing prey by impaling it on thorns or spikes. The specific name, souzae, honours the Portuguese zoologist José Augusto de Sousa, director of ornithology at the National Museum of Natural History and Science, Lisbon, who, despite never having visited Africa, wrote many papers on African birds.

== Description ==
Souza's shrike is a small shrike with a pale grey back which fades into a browner, black barred, lower back and rump. It has reddish brown wings and a long slender tail with brown inner feathers and white outer feathers. The tail and wings are both marked with fine barring. There is a white supercilium above the black facial mask and an obvious white scapulars which form a distinct V. The underparts are nearly wholly dusky, with the exception of the white throat. The males and females are rather similar; the females are duller and have a tawny patch on the flanks. The juveniles are duller and more uniform in colour, with brown heads, a brown facial mask, and fine, dense black barring on most of the body except for the whitish chin and throat. The bill and legs are black, and the iris is brown. Souza's shrike is 17 cm (6.7 in) in length.

=== Subspecific variation ===
The above description refers to the nominate subspecies L. s. souzae. L. s. burigi has more brownish upperparts, less reddish brown on the mantle and back, and darker wings and tail, with less barring on the wings. Overall, there is less barring, and the tawny flank patch of the females is more noticeable than on the nominate females. L.s. tacitus has a drab olive-brown mantle and paler wings than the nominate, with the tawny flank patch of females being duller and less obvious than that of L.s. souzae.

== Distribution and habitat ==
Souza's shrike is found in central Africa from central Congo east to western and southern Tanzania. It is widespread in the Democratic Republic of Congo south of Kinshasa. In Rwanda it is rare and confined to localities upriver of Rusumo Falls in savanna dominated by Pericopsis. In Tanzania this is an uncommon and localised species which has been recorded from Songea in southern Tanzania and from western Tanzania between Mpanda and Kibondo District, north as far as Lake Burigi. It probably also occurs in Burundi. It is a widespread species in Angola and Zambia, northern Malawi as far south as Thyolo and northern Mozambique. In the north it has been recorded once in Gabon. It is a rare species in northern Namibia and northern Botswana. It has not been recorded in Zimbabwe, but may occur in the northern part of that country.

This is a species of the region of tropical savanna which lies to the south of the rainforest and to the north of the arid steppe and desert region of southern Africa. It has different habitat requirements from its congeners, being a bird of woodland whete the forest becomes less dense. It can sometimes be seen at the edges of wee-wooded gardens, but in some areas it is restricted to lightly wooded areas of miombo, interspersed with short grass patches. In Rwanda it is restricted to Pericopsis savanna, and in Zambia it can be found in Burkea savanna.

=== Movements ===
Souza's shrike is largely sedentary, but there may be some local migrations during the dry season. Birds seen in Namibia and Botswana have probably moved from farther north. In Malawi it is absent from some areas in the non-breeding season.

== Biology ==
Souza's shrike is an ambush predator which typically perches beneath the canopy between 2 and 4 m (6 ft 7 in and 13 ft 1 in) above the ground, diving down on prey in a manner typical of shrikes. It has not been recorded creating larders of impaled prey. Its diet is not well known, but it has been recorded feeding on beetles, spiders and the occasional small bird. In areas where breeding has been recorded, it appears to coincide with the rains.

The nest is a deep, neat cup with thick walls made of twigs and plant stems. Its outside is covered by plant down and cobwebs. It is lined with creeper tendrils and soft grass, with some lichen. The inconspicuous nest is hidden in vegetation at heights between 3 and 6 m (9.8 and 19.7 ft), and is usually placed in a fork in a small tree or a tall bush. The clutch size is 2 or 3, rarely 4, probably incubated solely by the female.
