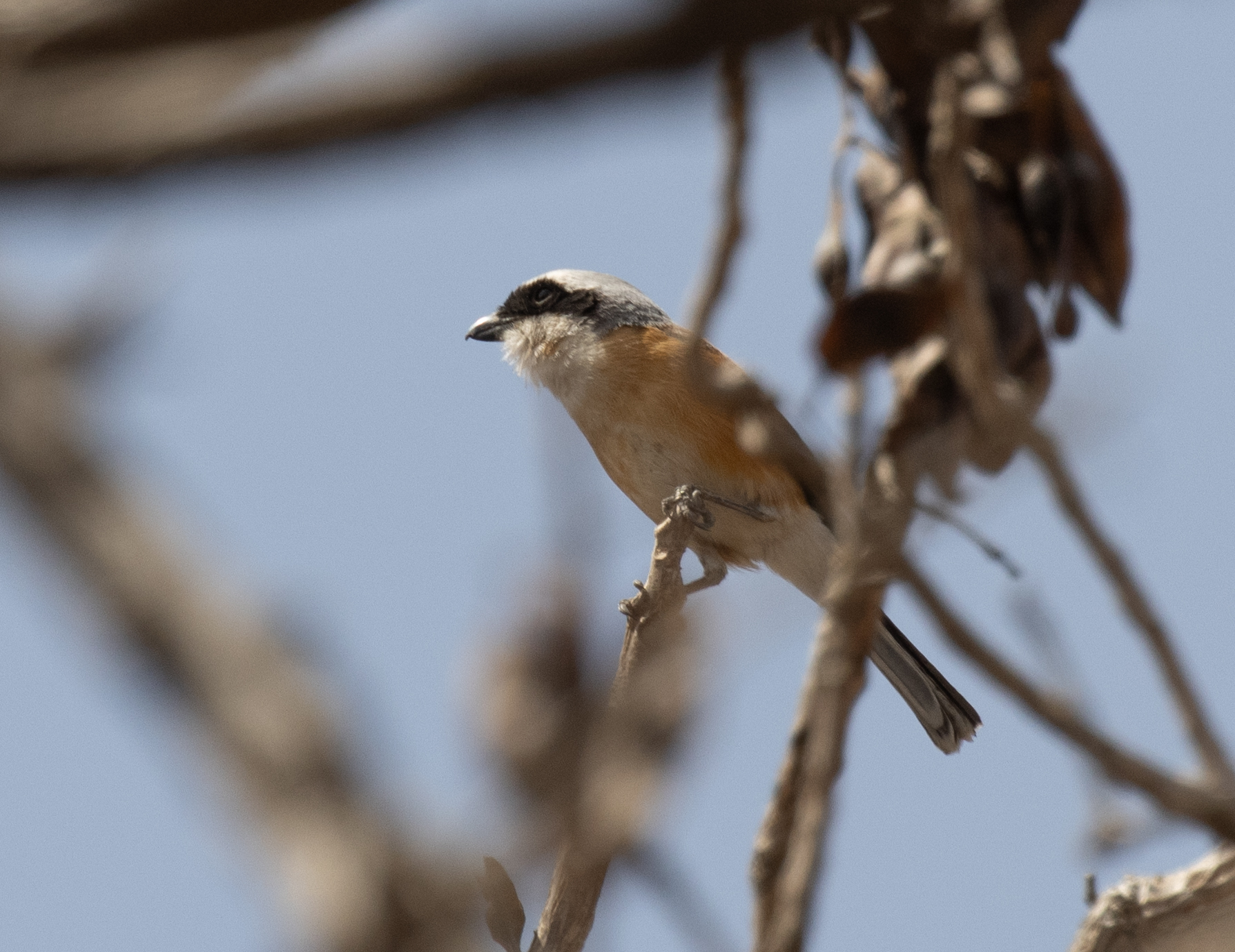

Conservation status
- Least Concern (IUCN 3.1)

Scientific classification
- Kingdom: Animalia
- Phylum: Chordata
- Class: Aves
- Order: Passeriformes
- Family: Laniidae
- Genus: Lanius
- Species: L. gubernator

Binomial name
- Lanius gubernator Hartlaub, 1882

= Emin's shrike =

Species of bird

Emin's shrike (Lanius gubernator) is a species of passerine bird in the family Laniidae, the shrikes. This species has a scattered distribution across Africa from the Ivory Coast east to South Sudan and Uganda.

== Taxonomy ==
Emin's shrike was first formally described in 1882 by the German physician and ornithologist Gustav Hartlaub, with its type locality given as "Central Africa", later determined to be Langomeri in the Nile Province of Uganda by Shelley in 1912.

This species has a plumage which resembles that of the Palearctic migrant red-backed shrike (L. collurio), and it was thought that Emin's shrike was a basal member of that lineage. However, the plumage similarity does not necessarily indicate a close relationship, and Emin's shrike was found, in phylogenetic molecular analyses, to be nested within the L. collaris species complex and to be most closely related to Mackinnon's shrike (L. mackinnoni). The genus Lanius, of which Emin's shrike is a member, is classified within the family Laniidae, which sits within the superfamily Corvoidea, part of the clade Corvides in the suborder Passeri of the order Passeriformes.

== Etymology ==
Emin's shrike belongs to the genus Lanius. This name is derived from the Latin word for "butcher", and some shrikes are known colloquially as "butcherbirds" for their habit of storing prey by impaling it on thorns or spikes. The specific name, gubernator, means "governor", and this, and its common name, refer to Emin Pasha, the German-born Ottoman, naturalist and governor of the Egyptian province of Equatoria on the upper Nile. Pasha collected the collected four types used by Hartlaub to write his description.

== Description ==
Emin's shrike is similar in plumage to the red-backed shrike, but it is smaller and darker. It has a black mask from the base of the bill through the eye to the ear coverts, which separates the grey crown and nape from the white throat. The upperparts are brown without the grey rump shown by the red-backed shrike. The breast, belly and undertail coverts are dark buff rather than the red-backed shrike's pinkish underparts. The black tail has white sides and a white tip, and there is an obvious patch of white on the primaries. This is not a highly sexually dimorphic species; the females are duller versions of the males, with a browner back, and the grey head having a brownish tinge. The juveniles are brownish barred, with blackish on the upper parts, and blackish barred pale tawny underparts. This is the smallest species in the genus Lanius, with a length of 14 or 15 cm (5.5 or 5.9 in).

== Distribution and habitat ==
Emin's shrike is found in western and north central Africa, and has a scattered distribution which lies in a broken belt to the north of the equator. It can be found in Mali in the Niger inland delta and on the Séno Plain and the Ivory Coast, mostly in Comoé National Park east to South Sudan and northern Uganda. Breeding has been confirmed only in Nigeria, Ghana and the Democratic Republic of Congo, but this species has been recorded from the Central African Republic and Benin, as well as the aforementioned states. There are no records from Togo or Burkina Faso, but the species may have been overlooked in these countries. This is a species of savanna, gallery forest, open woodland and forest clearings, including old carable fields and abandoned settlements.

== Biology ==
Emin's shrike is a little known species. It has been recorded forming small parties at certain times of the year, but it is mainly recorded as single birds or in pairs. The birds are usually conspicuous as they perch in the tops of bushes or on utility cables. Its hunting technique is typical of shrikes, catching food on the ground by swooping from a perch, also occasionally hawking prey in the air. The nests and eggs of Emin's shrike are unknown. The confirmed breeding records involve fledglings being fed by adults. Juveniles with barred plumage have been seen in the Democratic Republic of Congo in July, suggesting that breeding starts with the onset of the rains in March and April.
