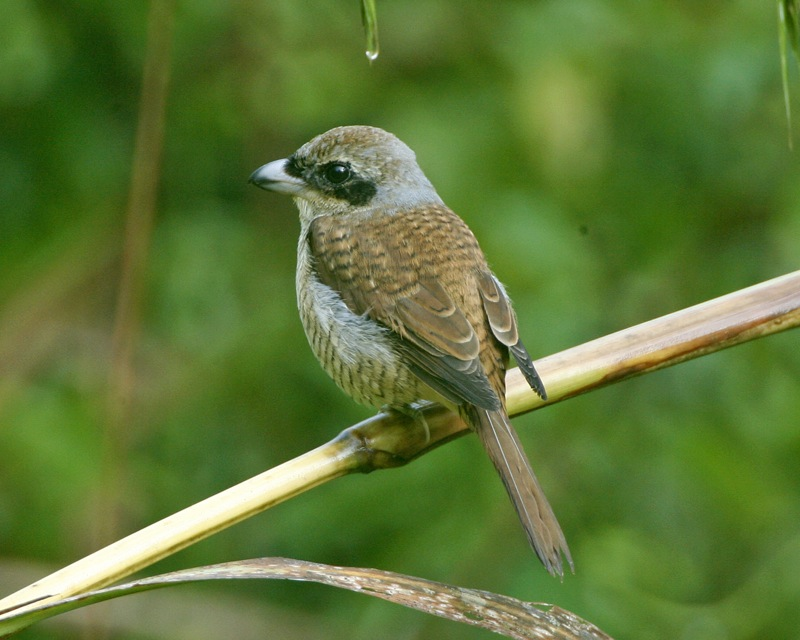
- Female at Panti forest, Malaysia

Conservation status
- Least Concern (IUCN 3.1)

Scientific classification
- Kingdom: Animalia
- Phylum: Chordata
- Class: Aves
- Order: Passeriformes
- Family: Laniidae
- Genus: Lanius
- Species: L. tigrinus

Binomial name
- Lanius tigrinus Drapiez, 1828

= Tiger shrike =

Species of bird

The tiger shrike or thick-billed shrike (Lanius tigrinus) is a small passerine bird which belongs to the genus Lanius in the shrike family, Laniidae. It is found in wooded habitats across eastern Asia. It is a shy, often solitary bird which is less conspicuous than most other shrikes. Like other shrikes it is predatory, feeding on small animals. Its nest is built in a tree and three to six eggs are laid.

It derives its name from the tiger-like pattern of its upperparts which are reddish-brown with dark bars. Adult males have white underparts and a grey head with a black mask. Females and young birds are duller and browner and young birds lack the grey and black on the head.

== Taxonomy ==
The tiger shrike was first described in 1822 by the Belgian naturalist Pierre Auguste Joseph Drapiez in the Dictionnaire classique d'histoire naturelle. He placed it in the genus Lanius, a group of about 26 species living in open areas across Eurasia, Africa and North America. The name of the genus means "butcher" in Latin, referring to the birds' habit of impaling and storing prey. Within the genus, analysis of calls suggests that the tiger shrike is most closely related to the brown shrike (L. cristatus) and bull-headed shrike (L. bucephalus). It has no recognized subspecies.

== Description ==
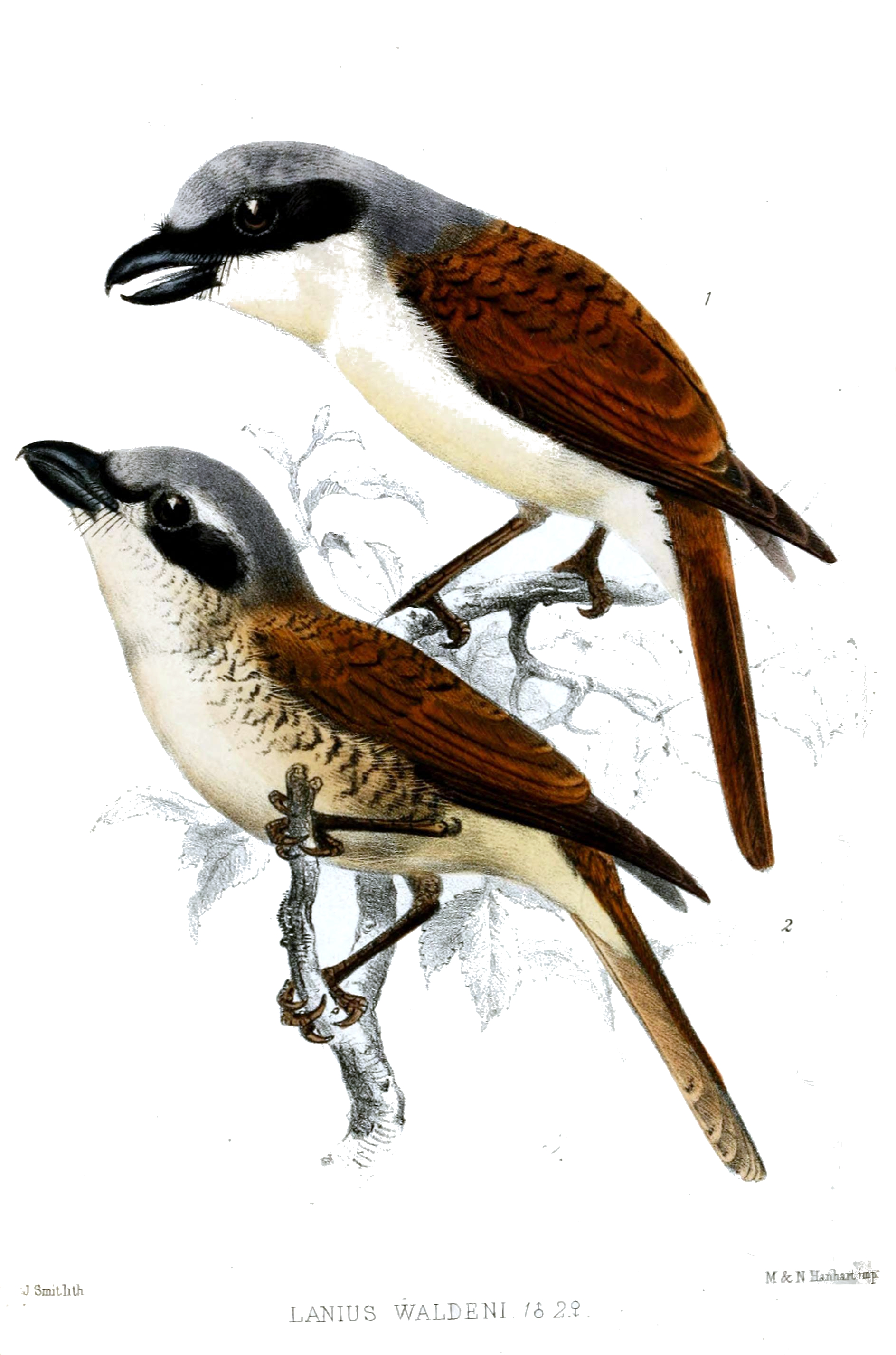
Male above and female below, illustration by Joseph Smit

It is a fairly small, stocky shrike, 17–19 cm long. Males weigh 27-29 grams and have a wing length of 77.8-83.9 mm, a tail length of 66.9-75.0 mm and a bill length of 14.1-15.9 mm. Females weigh 29-37 grams and have a wing length of 79.5-85.3 mm, a tail length of 66.3-79.1 mm and a bill length of 14.8-16.7 mm.

The thick bill is blue-black with a black tip and the legs are grey-black. The adult male's back, rump and shoulders are reddish-brown with blackish bars creating a tiger-like pattern. It has a black forehead and mask and grey crown and nape. The wings and tail are brown and the underparts are white, sometimes with faint barring on the flanks. Females are duller and browner than the males with a less extensive black mask, less grey on the head, a narrow white stripe above the eye, pale patch between the bill and eye and buff-white flanks with black barring. Juvenile birds have dark scale-like markings on the head, back and underparts and lack the grey and black on the head. Their bill has a pale base and the eye appears large due to a pale ring around it.

=== Similar species ===
The brown shrike is larger with a longer tail and thinner bill. Adults have a brown crown and nape, plain brown back and a white stripe over the eye. Juveniles are less contrastingly marked than the juvenile tiger shrike and have a dark mask. The bull-headed shrike is also larger and longer-tailed. Adults have a reddish-brown crown and nape and males have a white wing-patch. The Burmese shrike (Lanius collurioides) is slimmer and longer-tailed than the tiger shrike with a white wing-patch and a plain chestnut back.

=== Voice ===
Its song is a musical warbling. It has a variety of harsh calls including a loud, repeated territorial call, a chattering alarm call and a softer trilling call. It often calls from within cover but territorial males call from a prominent perch.

== Distribution and habitat ==
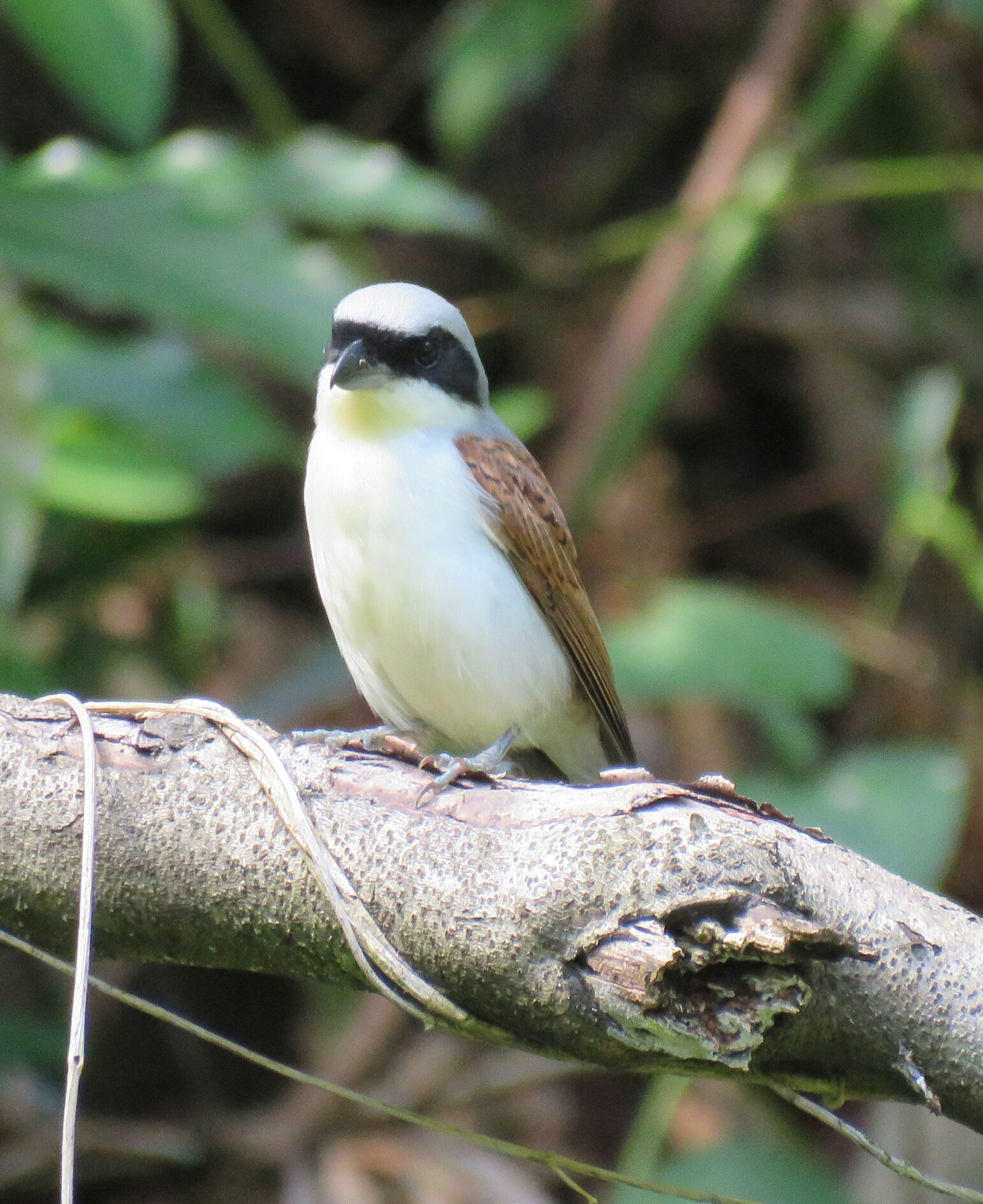
Male in Malaysia

It breeds in temperate regions of eastern Asia in deciduous or mixed woodland, forest edges and farmland with scattered trees. It is found in lowland areas, mainly occurring below 150 metres in Russia, 800 metres in Japan and 900 metres in China. Its range covers Ussuriland in the Russian Far East north to about 44°N, central and eastern China, Korea and northern and central parts of the Japanese island of Honshū.

It migrates southward in August and September, returning to the breeding grounds in May and June. It winters in tropical and subtropical regions of south-east Asia below 1,000 metres above sea-level. Its non-breeding range extends from south-east China south through eastern Burma, Thailand, Laos and Vietnam to Malaysia and Indonesia where a few reach Java and Bali in the south and Sulawesi in the east. In winter it occurs in forest clearings and edges, cultivated land, mangroves and gardens.

Vagrant birds have occurred in Hong Kong and the Philippines. In Australia, a dead bird which may have arrived on a ship was once found near Fremantle and a bird was seen on Christmas Island in April 2008.

It has a wide distribution and a fairly large population and is not considered threatened with BirdLife International classing it as least concern. However it has declined recently in Japan and Russia. In Japan, it is now uncommon and local but was formerly common and occurred in the suburbs of Tokyo.

== Behaviour ==
=== Feeding ===
Juvenile, Singapore, Oct 1994

It feeds mainly on insects, particularly grasshoppers, crickets, beetles, bugs, butterflies and moths. It also takes other arthropods and small birds and lizards. It typically hunts from a perch at the forest edge, perching less conspicuously than many other shrikes. It also forages among branches and leaves to find prey.

=== Reproduction ===
The breeding season lasts from May to July. Pairs form during northward migration or soon after arrival on the breeding grounds and are monogamous. Courting males perch by the female, bowing the body up and down and moving the head from side to side while uttering a soft subsong, a more subdued version of the normal song. They also perform a fast display-flight while calling.

The cup-shaped nest is built by both sexes, usually 1.5 to 5 metres above the ground on a branch in a deciduous tree but sometimes low down among bushes. It is made of stems, twigs, roots and other vegetation and is lined with grasses.

Three to six eggs are laid with five being most common. They are variable in colour with dark markings on a whitish, pinkish or blue-green background. They measure 21.2-24.1 mm by 15.3-17.8 mm. They are incubated by the female for 14–16 days. The young birds fledge after about two weeks and remain close to the nest for another two weeks. Usually one clutch of eggs is laid in a year but a second clutch is laid if the first one is destroyed. Strong winds and predation by common magpies result in the loss of many eggs.
