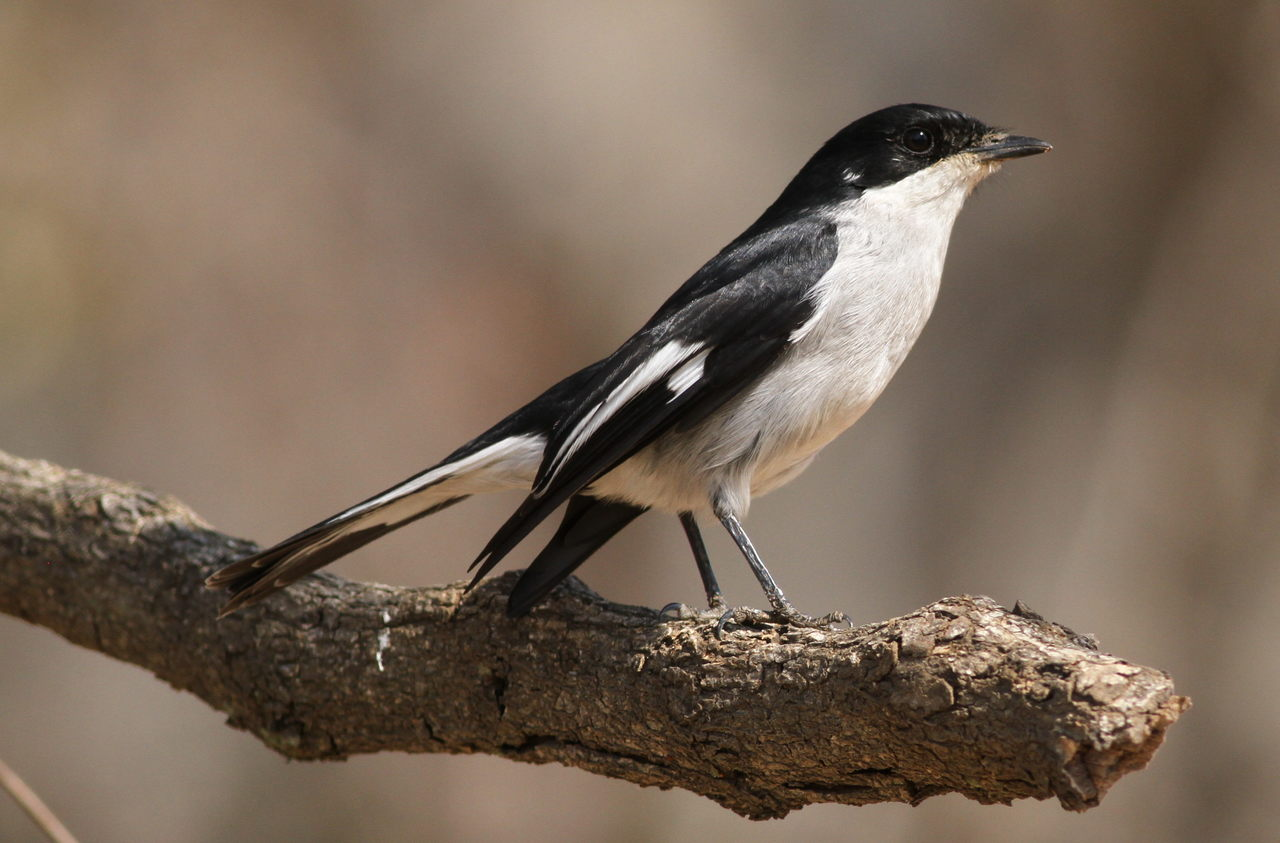

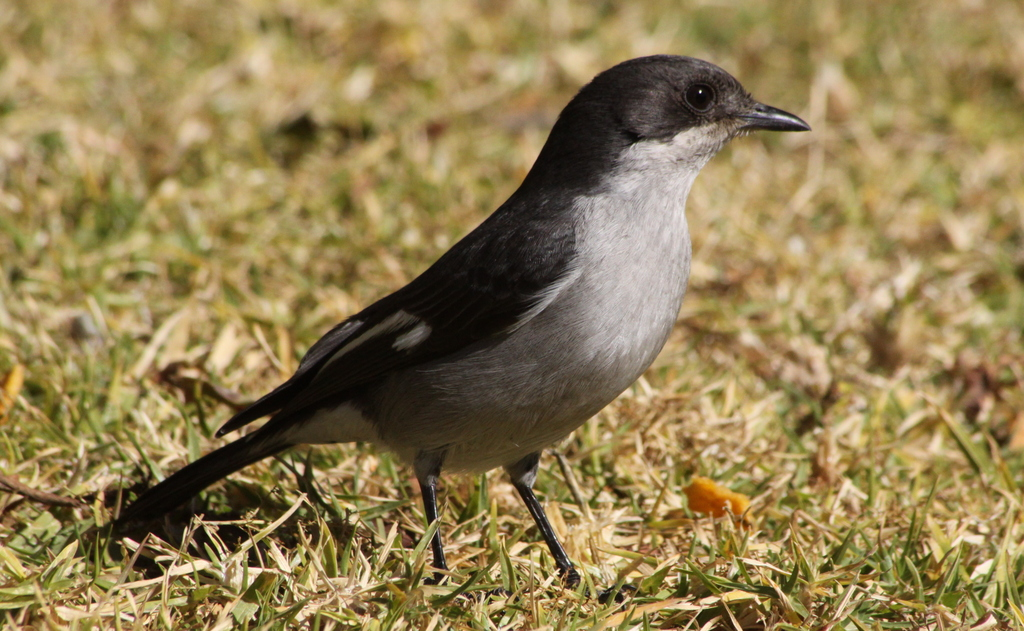
- Male and female

Conservation status
- Least Concern (IUCN 3.1)

Scientific classification
- Kingdom: Animalia
- Phylum: Chordata
- Class: Aves
- Order: Passeriformes
- Family: Muscicapidae
- Genus: Sigelus; Cabanis, 1850
- Species: S. silens

Binomial name
- Sigelus silens (Shaw, 1809)

Synonyms
- Melaenornis silens

= Fiscal flycatcher =

Species of bird

The fiscal flycatcher (Sigelus silens) is a small passerine bird in the Old World flycatcher family. It is the only species placed in the genus Sigelus. It is a resident breeder in Botswana, South Africa, Lesotho, Mozambique and Swaziland, and a vagrant to Namibia.

This species is found in subtropical open woodland, dry savanna, shrubland and suburban gardens.

== Taxonomy ==
The fiscal flycatcher was previously the only member of the genus Sigelus but was moved to Melaenornis based on the results of a molecular phylogenetic study published in 2010.

== Description ==
This black and white bird gets its name from its resemblance to the northern and southern fiscal shrikes (previously considered one species, common fiscal), shrikes that in turn get the name from their black and white suit-and-tie appearance reminiscent of the taxman ('fiscal'). The male may be confused with the fiscal shrikes, but the shrikes have heavy, hooked bills, white patches on the shoulder rather than the lower wing, and no white on their longer tails. The resemblance is assumed to be an example of Batesian mimicry.

The fiscal flycatcher is 17–20 cm in length. The adult male is black above and white below with white wing patches and white sides to the tail. The female is brown above, somewhat like an immature fiscal shrike, not black. The juvenile is like the female but duller and with brown spots and scalloping above and below.

The song is a weak chittering, and the alarm call is tssisk.

The fiscal flycatcher is larger than the male collared flycatcher, which has a white collar and lacks white wing panels.

== Behaviour ==
The fiscal flycatcher builds an open-cup nest from thin stems and other plant material, and lined with plant down. It is placed in a dense bush or thicket in a tree. In these respects it resembles the fiscal shrike.

The fiscal flycatcher feeds on insects, often taken in flight, but also on non-flying prey such as caterpillars. It may prey on the spiny caterpillars or "woolly worms" of tiger moths, after first scrubbing them on the ground or on bark, thereby denuding them of the worst of their spines. It also feeds on various species of small wild berries, such as Halleria and Chrysanthemoides, and from nectar-rich flowers such as some Aloe. In suburban gardens it commonly feeds opportunistically on domestic scraps.
