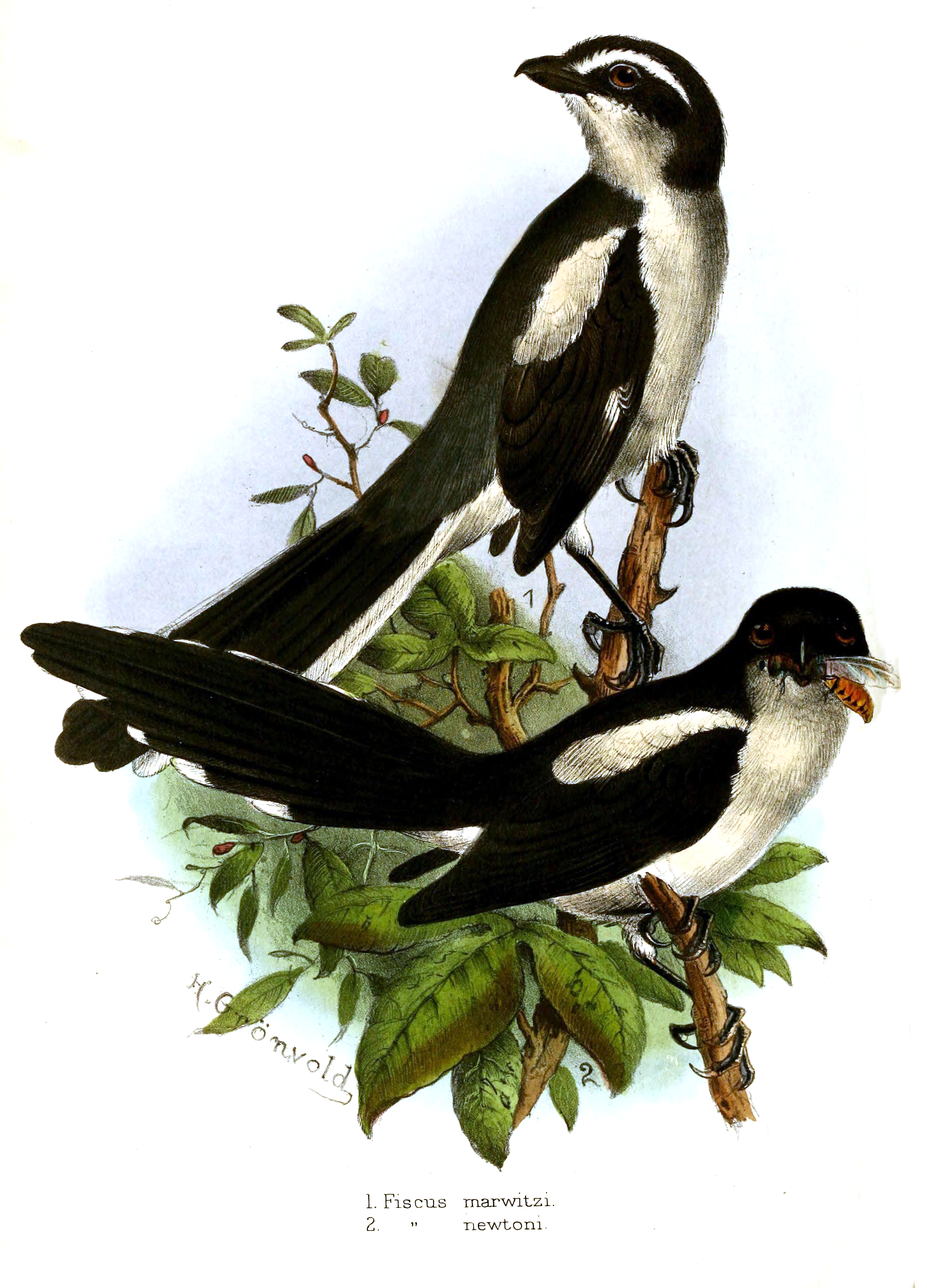
- Illustration (above) with Lanius newtoni (lower bird)

Scientific classification
- Kingdom: Animalia
- Phylum: Chordata
- Class: Aves
- Order: Passeriformes
- Family: Laniidae
- Genus: Lanius
- Species: L. collaris
- Subspecies: L. c. marwitzi

Trinomial name
- Lanius collaris marwitzi Reichenow, 1901

Synonyms
- Lanius marwitzi

= Uhehe fiscal =

Subspecies of bird

The Uhehe fiscal (Lanius collaris marwitzi) is a bird in the family Laniidae. It is endemic to the uplands of southern and eastern Tanzania. Some taxonomic authorities treat this species as a subspecies of the southern fiscal (Lanius collaris).

== Description ==
The Uhehe fiscal is a slender, black and white bird growing to about 20 cm (8 in). The sexes are similar. The upper parts are dull black, with a white supercilium and white scapulars. The back, rump and upper tail coverts are dark grey, and the long tail is black. All the tail feathers except the two central ones have white spots. The wings are black except for a small white patch. The underparts are whitish, sometimes washed with buff. It could be confused with the southern fiscal, but its colouration is distinctly darker and it occurs at higher elevations.

== Ecology ==
Little is known of the habits and ecology of this species, but they are likely to be similar to those of the southern fiscal. It seems to be a shy and rather quiet bird.

== Distribution and habitat ==
The Uhehe fiscal is found only in southern and eastern Tanzania at elevations of above 1,500 m (4,920 ft), from Mpwapwa and the Ukaguru Mountains to Njombe, Mount Rungwe and Tukuyu. Its typical habitat is scrubland.
