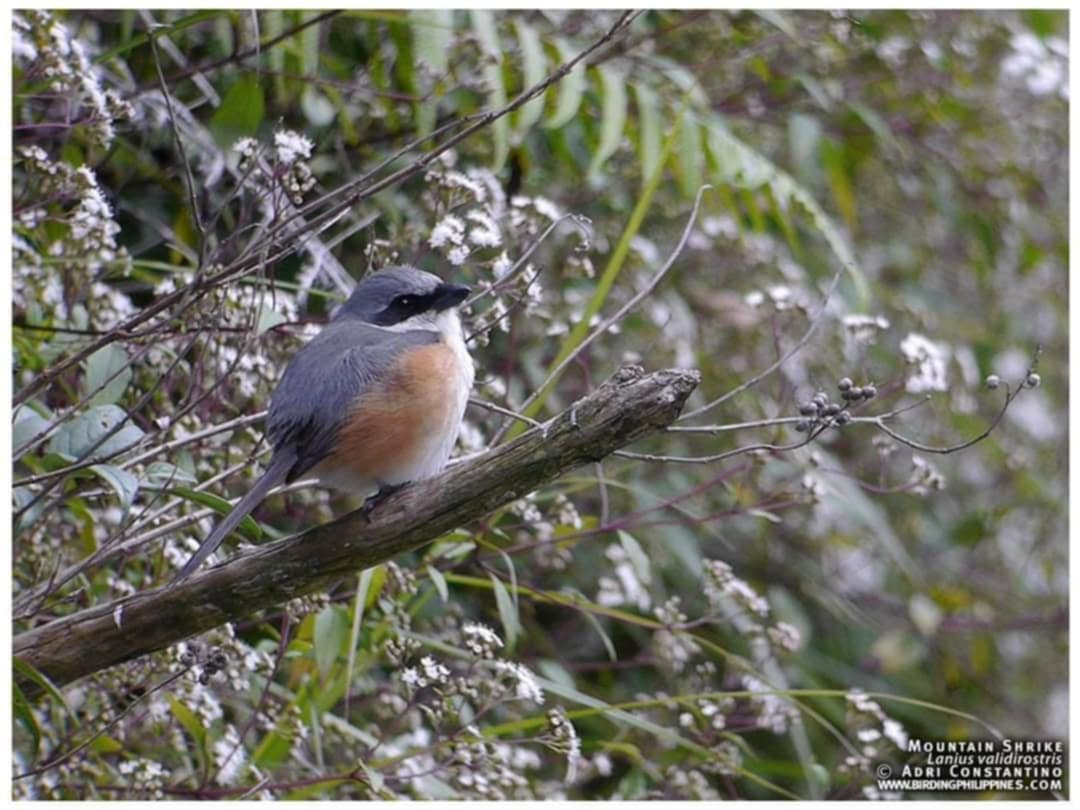
- Mountain Shrike (nominate subspecies) seen in Mt. Province

Conservation status
- Least Concern (IUCN 3.1)

Scientific classification
- Kingdom: Animalia
- Phylum: Chordata
- Class: Aves
- Order: Passeriformes
- Family: Laniidae
- Genus: Lanius
- Species: L. validirostris

Binomial name
- Lanius validirostris Ogilvie-Grant, 1894

= Mountain shrike =

Species of bird

The mountain shrike (Lanius validirostris) or grey-capped shrike, is a species of bird in the family Laniidae. It is endemic to the Philippines found on the islands of Luzon, Mindoro and Mindanao. Its habitat are tropical montane secondary forest, forest edge and grassland above 1,200 meters above sea level.

== Description and taxonomy ==
=== Subspecies ===
Three subspecies are recognized:

- Lanius validirostris validirostris: Found on Luzon; Largest in size and white belly and breast
- Lanius validirostris hachisuka: Found on Mindanao; Intermediate in size and rich rufous breast and belly
- Lanius validirostris tertius: Found on Mindoro; Smallest in size and light rufous breast and belly

== Ecology and behavior ==
Diet consists mostly of insects. Due to its very thick and strong bill adapted for cracking hard shells, beetles are believed to be an important part of its diet. It is typically found alone or in pairs. Perches on exposed branches on top of trees or bushes where it dives for prey.

Birds collected in breeding condition with enlarged gonads have been collected from February to June. A pair seen feeding a juvenile in May. This species is believed to be monogamous and territorial.

== Habitat and conservation status ==
It is found in montane secondary forest, forest edge, open woodland and grassland areas from 1,200 to 2,400 meters above sea level. It appears to be limited to drier areas, and has been found in areas both with or without pine trees. Little else is known about this bird.

IUCN has assessed this bird as least concern with the population believe to be stable. Although it has a limited range, due to the relative security of its montane habitat and its regular presence within its habitat it is not listed as threatened.

There are currently no species targeted conservation programs . Conservation actions proposed include to surveys in areas within and surrounding the species's range to determine distribution and abundance, as well as assess population and habitat loss. Conduct ecological studies to improve understanding and tolerance to habitat degradation. Protect areas of habitat occupied by the species and safeguard against future threats.
