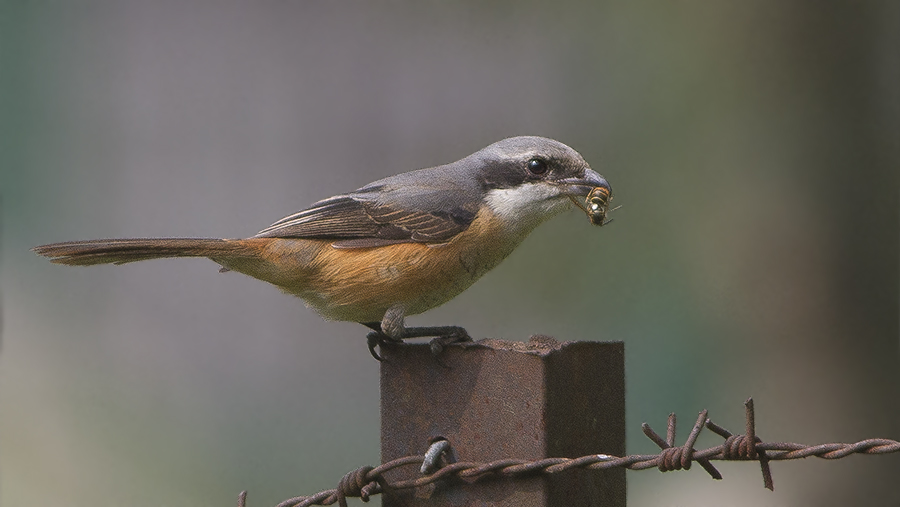
- Lanius tephronotus tephronotus from Khangchendzonga Biosphere Reserve, West Sikkim, India

Conservation status
- Least Concern (IUCN 3.1)

Scientific classification
- Kingdom: Animalia
- Phylum: Chordata
- Class: Aves
- Order: Passeriformes
- Family: Laniidae
- Genus: Lanius
- Species: L. tephronotus

Binomial name
- Lanius tephronotus (Vigors, 1831)

= Grey-backed shrike =

Species of bird

The grey-backed shrike (Lanius tephronotus) is a bird in the family Laniidae inhabiting South-east Asia.

== Taxonomy and systematics ==
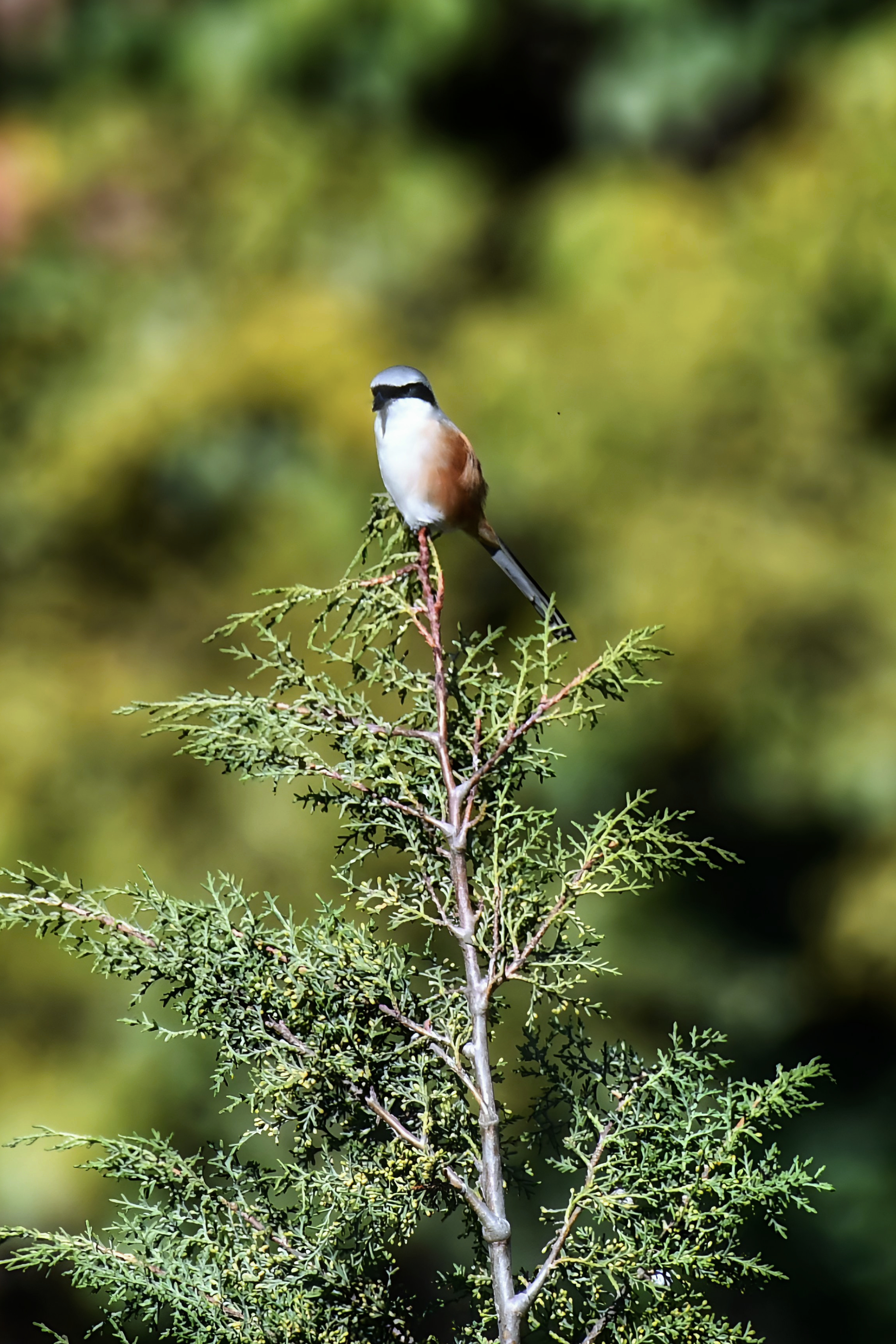
Grey-backed shrike, Uttarakhand, India

The grey-backed shrike was first described in 1831 by Nicholas Aylward Vigors as L. tephronotus collected near Darjeeling, India. It is closely allied with L. schach, and formerly treated as conspecific, but differs in morphology; moreover, the two species are largely sympatric and, although race lahulensis sometimes considered to represent a hybrid population between them, there is no definite proof of interbreeding. Two subspecies (L. t. lahulensis and L. t. tephronotus) are recognized.

== Description ==
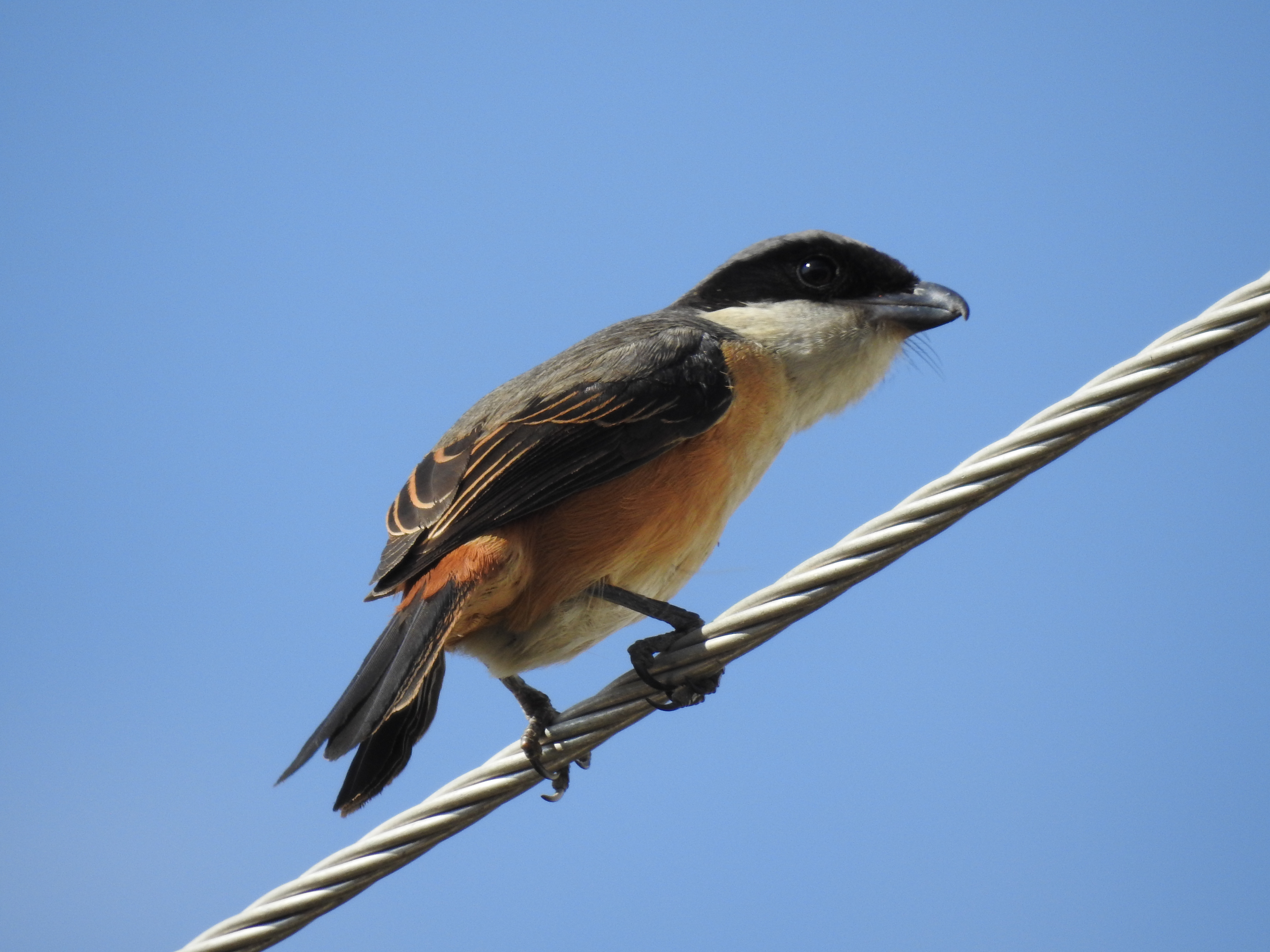
In China

The species is 21–25 cm long and weighs 39-54 g. It is a shrike with long tail. The nominate race has black lowermost forehead (just over base of bill) and facial mask through lores and eye to rear ear-coverts; crown to nape and most of upperparts dark grey, small rufous rump patch; upperwing black, most wing-coverts, secondaries and tertials fringed pale rufous to whitish, sometimes tiny white patch at base of primaries (often lacking); tail chestnut-brown, tipped buffish, outermost pair of rectrices light brown; throat and undertail brownish-grey; iris dark brown; bill black or dark green; legs dull black or dark green. Sexes very similar. Juvenile is browner above than adult, with less marked brown (not black) facial mask, horn-colored lower mandible, has crown finely barred, upperparts and much of underparts heavily barred dark brownish. Race lahulensis is smaller and weaker-billed than nominate, also much paler, brownish-grey above, with rufous lower back and rump, white primary patch usually slightly larger and more visible, tail sometimes blackish (not brown).

Voice: Rough, breathing-like call. Territorial call described as harsh zzert-zzert..., tchert-tchert... or tzert-tzert...; repertoire includes also a repeated ktcht-ktcht-ktcht given at dusk or as alarm. Breeding song subdued and musical, with mimicry of other bird calls lasting several minutes. Voice seems to be similar to that of L. schach.

== Distribution and habitat ==
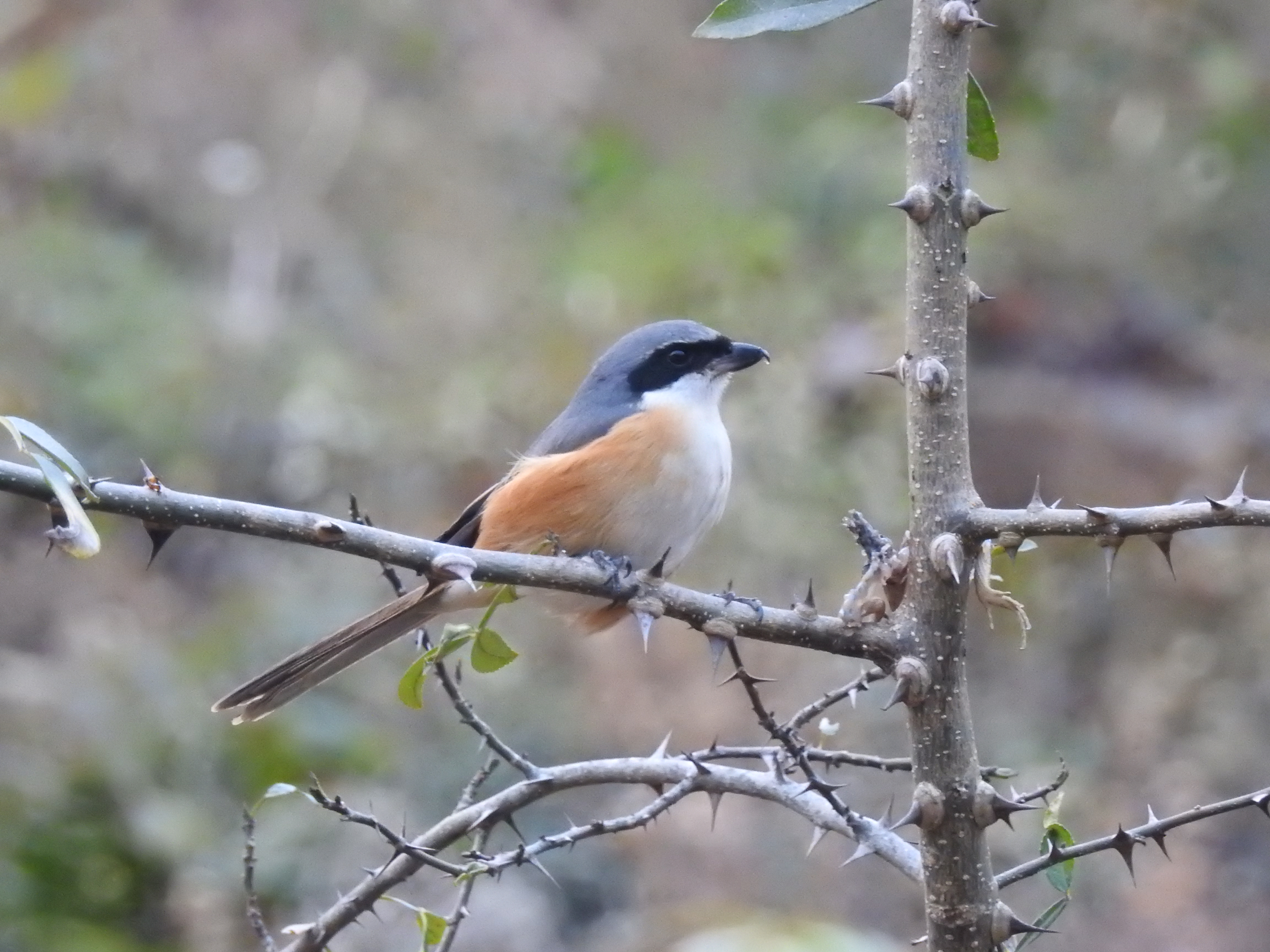
In China

The grey-backed shrike has two subspecies. L. t. lahulensis (Koelz, 1950) breeds from north Kashmir east to central India (Uttar Pradesh), and southwest China. L. t. tephronotus (Vigors, 1831) breeding range extends from Nepal east to northeast India (Arunachal Pradesh), and center and south China (southern Gansu, Ningxia and eastern Shanxi south to southeast Qinghai, south and east Xizang, southeast Yunnan and central Guizhou); non-breeding distribution stretches south to Bangladesh, Myanmar, Thailand and Indochina.

Breeds at high elevations in forest clearings, plateau plains and mountain meadows dotted with small trees or fairly large bushes; to at least 4500 m in Nepal (becoming common from 2700 m upwards) and in south China (Yunnan). Post-breeding habitat in Sichuan (south China) either young open coniferous stands with forest clearings dominated by bushes, or pastures at higher elevations; at lower altitudes occurs in extensive agricultural valleys near human settlements. On non-breeding grounds in valleys and plains found in variety of habitats, including gardens and abandoned cultivation.

== Behavior and ecology ==
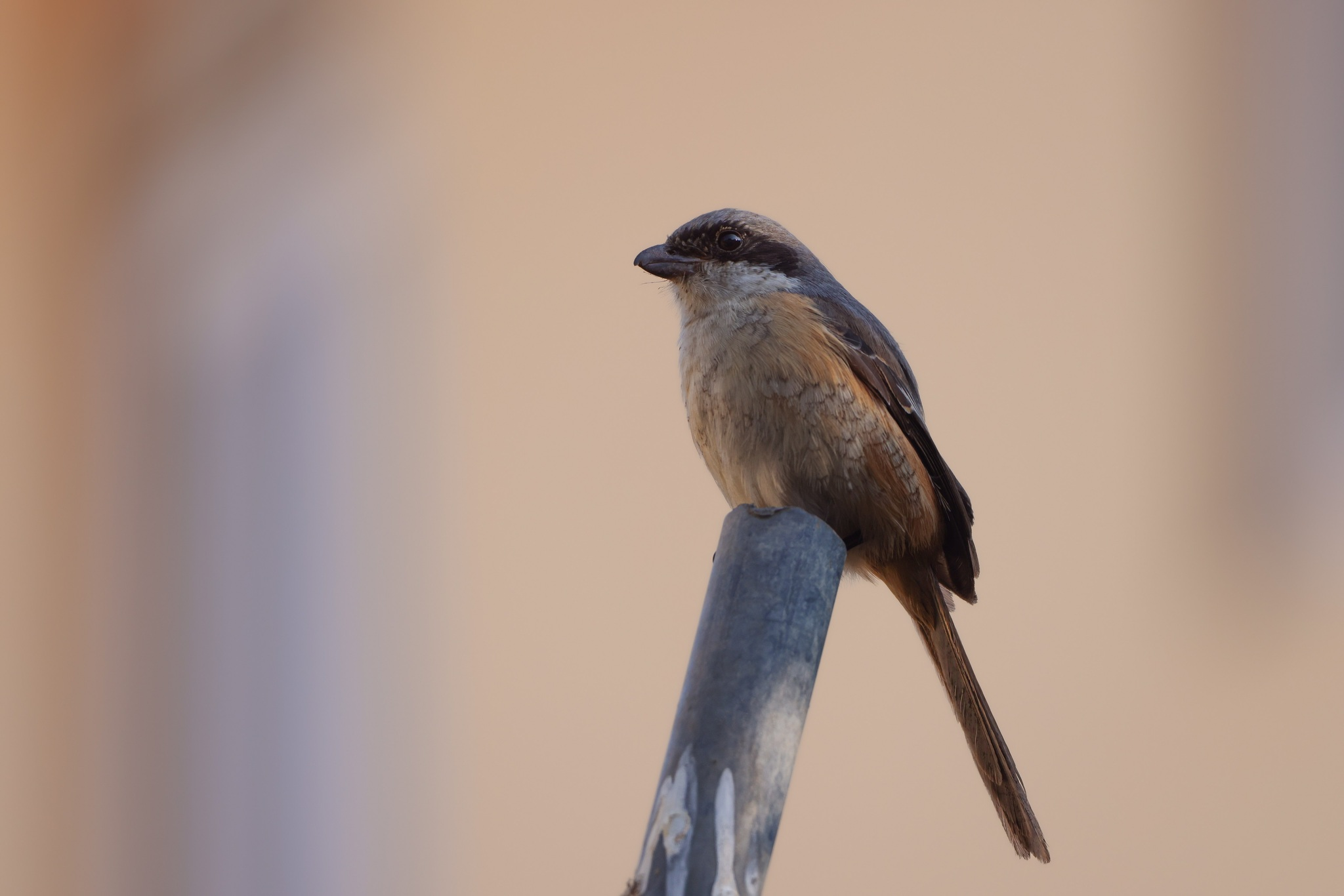
In Nepal

=== Breeding ===
The grey-backed shrikes nest between June and July in India and April and August (mainly May–June) in south China (Xizang), at elevations of 4010–4540 m with a delay in nesting time with increased elevation. Territorial; residents maintain territory throughout year. Nests were built mostly in bushes, 0.7–3 m above the ground. Nests are bulky, with rather untidy-looking cap, external diameter 11–20 cm and height c. 8.5 cm, made mainly of moss, straw, rose stem, grass stem and brown palm, inlaid with blue eared pheasant's feather and slender grass stem. Nests are placed about 2 m up in small tree or bush, either isolated or in streamside thicket or row of trees. Clutch 3-6 eggs and clutch size smaller for pairs that nested later at higher elevations. Female lay one egg each day after nested. Eggs pale grayish with numerous lavender marks and brown or grey-brown blotches or spots, and usually form rings at the blunt end. Incubation by females begin after the last egg been laid and lasts 15–18 days. During the incubation the females are reluctant to be away from her nest, and males act as nest defenders, make a rapid ga.ga.ga... call when other animals approach the nest and fly to drive them away. Nestlings are cared for by both parents for 14–15 days.

Compared with their lowland congeners, the grey-backed shrikes nesting in alpine habitats experienced shorter breeding seasons, produced fewer broods, smaller clutches, and larger eggs. They followed a life history strategy that allowed them to compensate for reduced annual fecundity under harsh conditions.

=== Food and feeding ===
Mostly insects, such as moths, crickets and grasshoppers (Orthoptera), beetles (Coleoptera) and caterpillars; small vertebrates, such as lizards, frogs, birds and small rodents, may also be consumed. The grey-backed shrikes are mainly sit-and-wait predators, often perching at the top of high grasses, bushes, or trees while looking for moving prey, so the availability of good quality perch sites in foraging areas is important for them. They taking prey mostly on ground but occasionally also hawk insects in the air. During the breeding season they only hunt within 150 meters near the nest. They also have the preference to impale prey and keep larder just as other shrikes.

=== Movements ===
Most individuals winter at lower altitudes within breeding range. Northwest race lahulensis appears to be resident or to descend to foothills of Himalayas, whereas nominate race either undertakes altitudinal movements or migrates to non-breeding areas farther south. Non-breeders recorded from plains of south China, India south to west Bengal, Bangladesh, Myanmar, north Thailand, Laos and north Vietnam. Migrants arrive back on breeding territories by early May. Chinese breeders appear to be mainly altitudinal migrants within their breeding range.

== Relationship to humans ==
Grey-backed shrikes preferred sites close to human settlements, because these habitats offered a better foraging substrate and places safe from large predators. They appear to be naturally common across a widespread area and there is no evidence of them being globally threatened. But this species is more at risk if their habitats are altered by changes in land management activities, and high-elevation habitat considered more secure than lower-lying ones.

== Status ==
The grey-backed shrike has an extremely large range and appears to be naturally common across a widespread area. The population trend appears to be stable, and hence the species does not approach the thresholds for vulnerable under the population trend criterion (>30% decline over ten years or three generations). The population size has not been quantified, but it is not believed to approach the thresholds for Vulnerable under the population size criterion (<10,000 mature individuals with a continuing decline estimated to be >10% in ten years or three generations, or with a specified population structure). For these reasons the species is evaluated as Least Concern.
