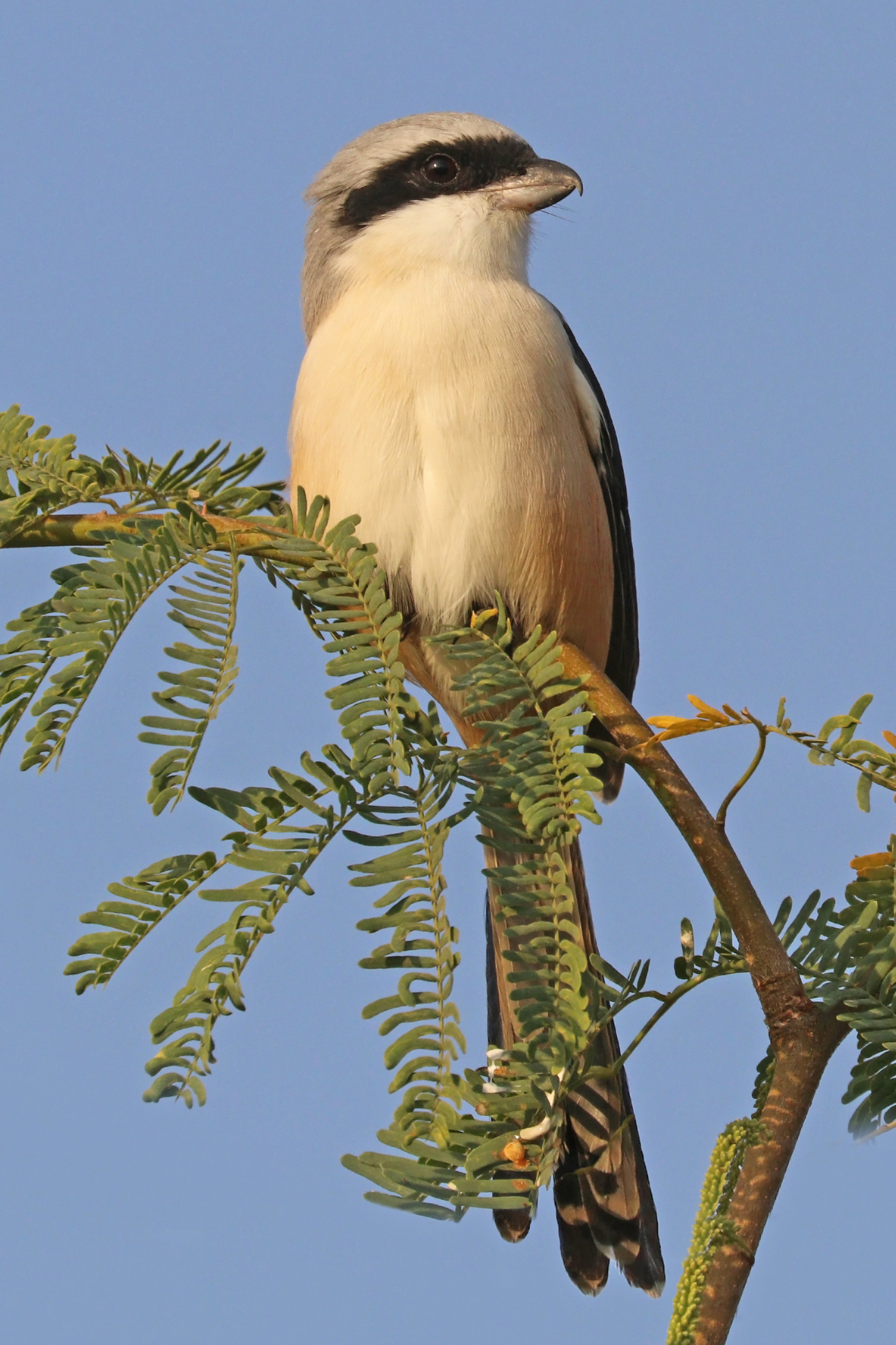
- Great grey shrike L. excubitor lahtora, India

Scientific classification
- Kingdom: Animalia
- Phylum: Chordata
- Class: Aves
- Order: Passeriformes
- Family: Laniidae
- Genus: Lanius; Linnaeus, 1758

Type species
- Lanius excubitor Linnaeus, 1758

Species
- Many, see text

= Lanius =

Genus of birds

Lanius, the typical shrikes, are a genus of passerine birds in the shrike family Laniidae. The majority of the family's species are placed in this genus. The genus name, Lanius, is derived from the Latin word for "butcher", and some shrikes are also known as "butcher birds" because of their feeding habits. The common English name "shrike" is from Old English scríc, "shriek", referring to the shrill call.

Some African species are known as fiscals. That name comes from the Afrikaans word fiskaal ("public official", especially a hangman), because they hang their prey on thorns for storage.

Most Lanius species occur in Eurasia and Africa, but the Northern shrike is found in eastern Asia and North America, while the loggerhead shrike is confined to North America. There are no members of this genus or the shrike family in South America or Australia.

Lanius shrikes are birds of open habitats typically seen perched upright on a prominent perch like a treetop or a telephone pole. They sally out for prey, taken in flight or the ground. These species primarily take large insects, but will also take small birds, reptiles and mammals. For large northern species such as the great grey, the majority of the prey will be vertebrates, especially in winter.

Despite their diet, these are not true birds of prey, and lack the strong talons of the raptors. Though they use their feet to hold smaller insects, larger prey items are impaled upon a sharp point, such as a thorn or the barbs of barbed wire. Thus secured they can be ripped open with the hooked bill.

Most Lanius shrikes are solitary, except when breeding and are highly territorial. Northern or temperate species such as the great grey and red-backed shrikes are migratory and winter well south of the breeding range.

The sexes of most species are distinguishable, the male invariably being the brighter bird where there is a difference.

There are some natural groupings within the genus, such as the seven African fiscals, the large grey species (ludovicianus, excubitor, meridionalis and sphenocercus) and the Eurasian brown-backed species (tigrinus, bucephalus, collurio, isabellinus, cristatus and gubernator). In the last group in particular, it has been difficult to define species’ boundaries, and in the past several of these shrikes have been lumped as conspecific.

The prehistoric shrike Lanius miocaenus has been described from Early Miocene fossils found at Langy, France.

== Taxonomy and species list ==
The genus Lanius was introduced by the Swedish naturalist Carl Linnaeus in 1758 in the tenth edition of his Systema Naturae. The type species was designated as the great grey shrike by the English naturalist William Swainson in 1824. The genus name is a Latin word meaning "butcher".

The genus contains the following 32 species:

Image	Common name	Scientific name	Distribution
	Long-tailed fiscal	Lanius cabanisi	southern Somalia, southern and southeastern Kenya, from the shores of Lake Victoria to the coast; and northern and eastern Tanzania south to Dar es Salaam
	Grey-backed fiscal	Lanius excubitoroides	Burundi, Cameroon, Central African Republic, Chad, Democratic Republic of the Congo, Ethiopia, Kenya, Mali, Mauritania, Nigeria, Rwanda, Sudan, Tanzania, and Uganda
	Taita fiscal	Lanius dorsalis	southeastern South Sudan, southern Ethiopia, and western Somalia to northeastern Tanzania
	Great grey shrike	Lanius excubitor	Eurasia and northern Africa
	Somali fiscal	Lanius somalicus	Djibouti, Ethiopia and Somalia in the Horn of Africa, as well as in Kenya in the African Great Lakes region
	Loggerhead shrike	Lanius ludovicianus	southern Canada, the contiguous USA and Mexico
	Giant grey shrike	Lanius giganteus	central China
	Chinese grey shrike	Lanius sphenocercus	China, Japan, North Korea, South Korea, Mongolia, and Russia
	Iberian grey shrike	Lanius meridionalis	southwestern Europe
	Northern shrike	Lanius borealis	North America and Siberia
	Masked shrike	Lanius nubicus	southeastern Europe and at the eastern end of the Mediterranean
	São Tomé fiscal	Lanius newtoni	São Tomé Island, São Tomé and Príncipe
	Northern fiscal	Lanius humeralis	Sub-Saharan Africa
	Emin's shrike	Lanius gubernator	Cameroon, Central African Republic, Democratic Republic of the Congo, Ivory Coast, Ghana, Guinea-Bissau, Mali, Nigeria, Senegal, South Sudan, and Uganda
	Mackinnon's shrike	Lanius mackinnoni	Western and Central Africa, including Angola, Burundi, Cameroon, Congo, Democratic Republic of Congo, Equatorial Guinea, Gabon, Kenya, Nigeria, Rwanda, Tanzania and Uganda
	Souza's shrike	Lanius souzae	Angola to Botswana, Republic of the Congo, Democratic Republic of the Congo, Gabon, Malawi, Mozambique, Namibia, Rwanda, Tanzania and Zambia
	Southern fiscal	Lanius collaris	Sub-Saharan Africa
	Lesser grey shrike	Lanius minor	southern France, Switzerland, Austria, Czech Republic, Italy, the former Yugoslavia, Albania, Greece, Romania, Bulgaria and southern Russia
	Woodchat shrike	Lanius senator	southern Europe, northern Africa and the Middle East
	Burmese shrike	Lanius collurioides	Bangladesh, Cambodia, China, India, Laos, Myanmar, Thailand, and Vietnam
	Tiger shrike	Lanius tigrinus	Russia, Japan and China
	Bay-backed shrike	Lanius vittatus	Afghanistan, Pakistan, Nepal and India
	Isabelline shrike	Lanius isabellinus	Mongolia and northern China; winters to southern Asia and Africa
	Red-backed shrike	Lanius collurio	Western Europe east to central Russia
	Red-tailed shrike	Lanius phoenicuroides	south Siberia and central Asia
	Mountain shrike	Lanius validirostris	Philippines
	Brown shrike	Lanius cristatus	northern Asia from Mongolia to Siberia and in South Asia, Myanmar and the Malay Peninsula
	Bull-headed shrike	Lanius bucephalus	northeast China, Korea, Japan and far-eastern Russia
	Long-tailed shrike	Lanius schach	across Asia from Kazakhstan to New Guinea
	Grey-backed shrike	Lanius tephronotus	Bangladesh, India (Uttarakhand), Nepal, Bhutan, China (Yunnan)

=== Former species ===
Formerly, some authorities also considered the following species (or subspecies) as species within the genus Lanius:

- Crested shriketit (as Lanius frontatus)
- Rufous whistler (as Lanius macularius)
- Northern variable pitohui (as Lanius kirhocephalus)
- Red-whiskered bulbul (as Lanius jocosus)
- Grey-cheeked bulbul (as Lanius Bres)
