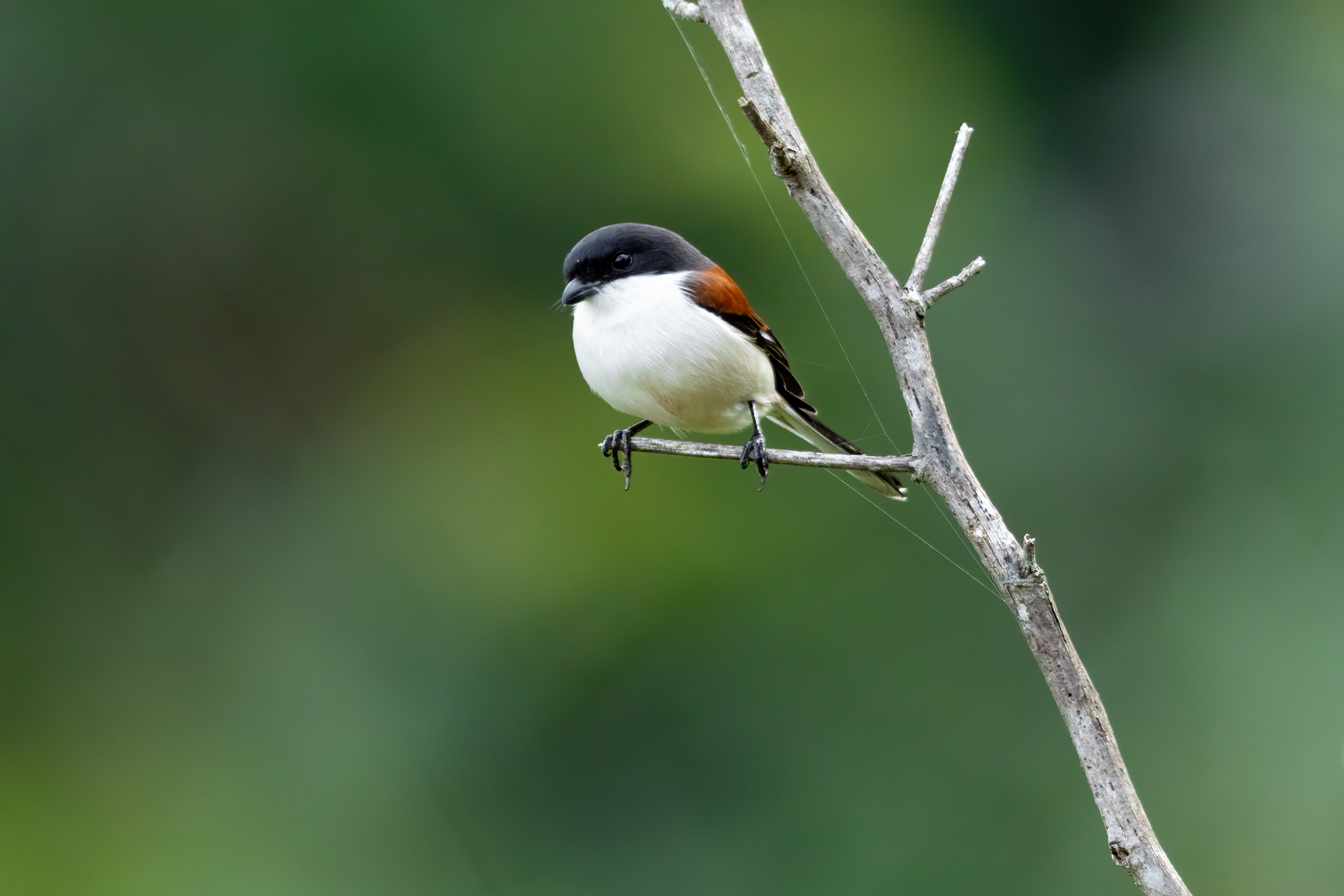

Conservation status
- Least Concern (IUCN 3.1)

Scientific classification
- Kingdom: Animalia
- Phylum: Chordata
- Class: Aves
- Order: Passeriformes
- Family: Laniidae
- Genus: Lanius
- Species: L. collurioides

Binomial name
- Lanius collurioides Lesson, 1831

= Burmese shrike =

Species of bird

The Burmese shrike (Lanius collurioides) is a species of bird in the family Laniidae. It is found in Bangladesh, Cambodia, China, India, Laos, Myanmar (Burma), Thailand, and Vietnam. Its natural habitats are subtropical or tropical moist lowland forest and subtropical or tropical moist montane forest.
