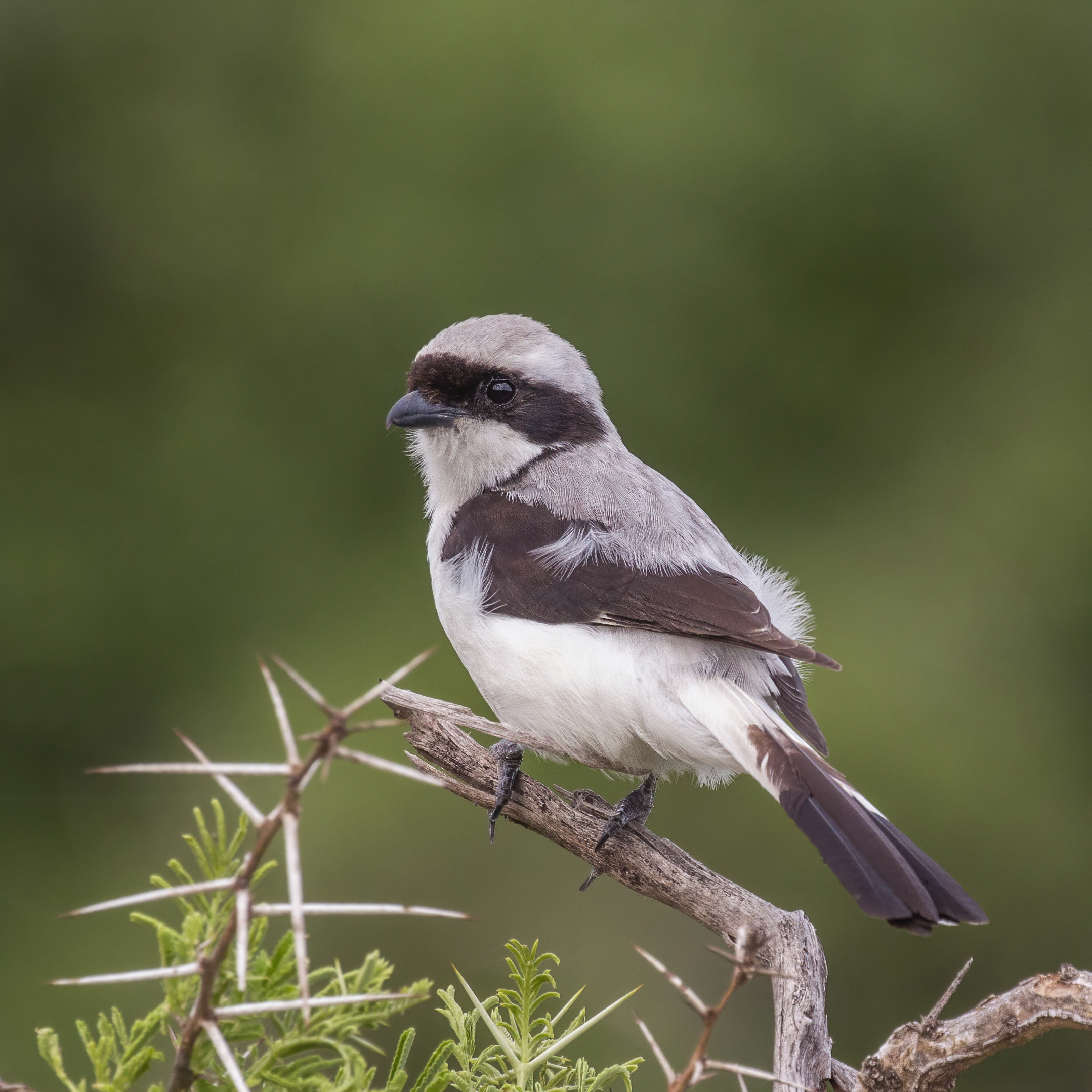
- male Queen Elizabeth National Park, Uganda

Conservation status
- Least Concern (IUCN 3.1)

Scientific classification
- Kingdom: Animalia
- Phylum: Chordata
- Class: Aves
- Order: Passeriformes
- Family: Laniidae
- Genus: Lanius
- Species: L. excubitoroides

Binomial name
- Lanius excubitoroides Prévost & Des Murs, 1847

= Grey-backed fiscal =

Species of bird

The grey-backed fiscal (Lanius excubitoroides) is a species of bird in the family Laniidae. It is found in Burundi, Cameroon, Central African Republic, Chad, Democratic Republic of the Congo, Ethiopia, Kenya, Mali, Mauritania, Nigeria, Rwanda, Sudan, Tanzania, and Uganda. Its natural habitats are dry savanna and subtropical or tropical dry lowland grassland.

== Description ==
This is a large shrike with a length of about 25 cm (10 in). The head of the male has a grey crown, a white supercilium and a large black mask. The upper parts are medium grey, the rump is white, the wings are blackish, with a white patch which is conspicuous in flight, and the long tail has a white base and a black tip. The underparts and base of the underside of the tail are white. The female is similar but has patches of chestnut on the flanks that are visible during display and when the bird is preening. The juvenile is brownish with brown wings and tail and is heavily barred with grey.

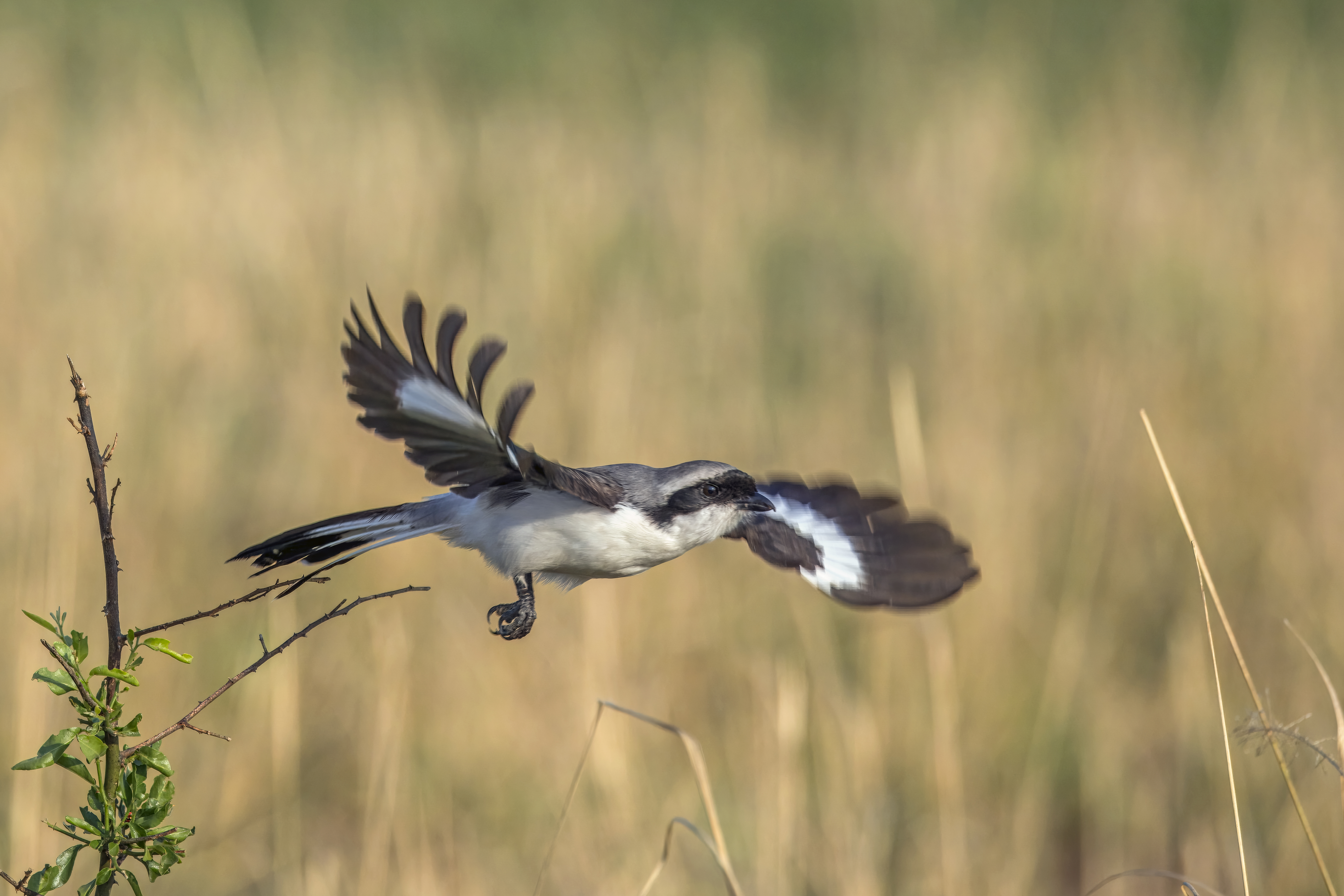

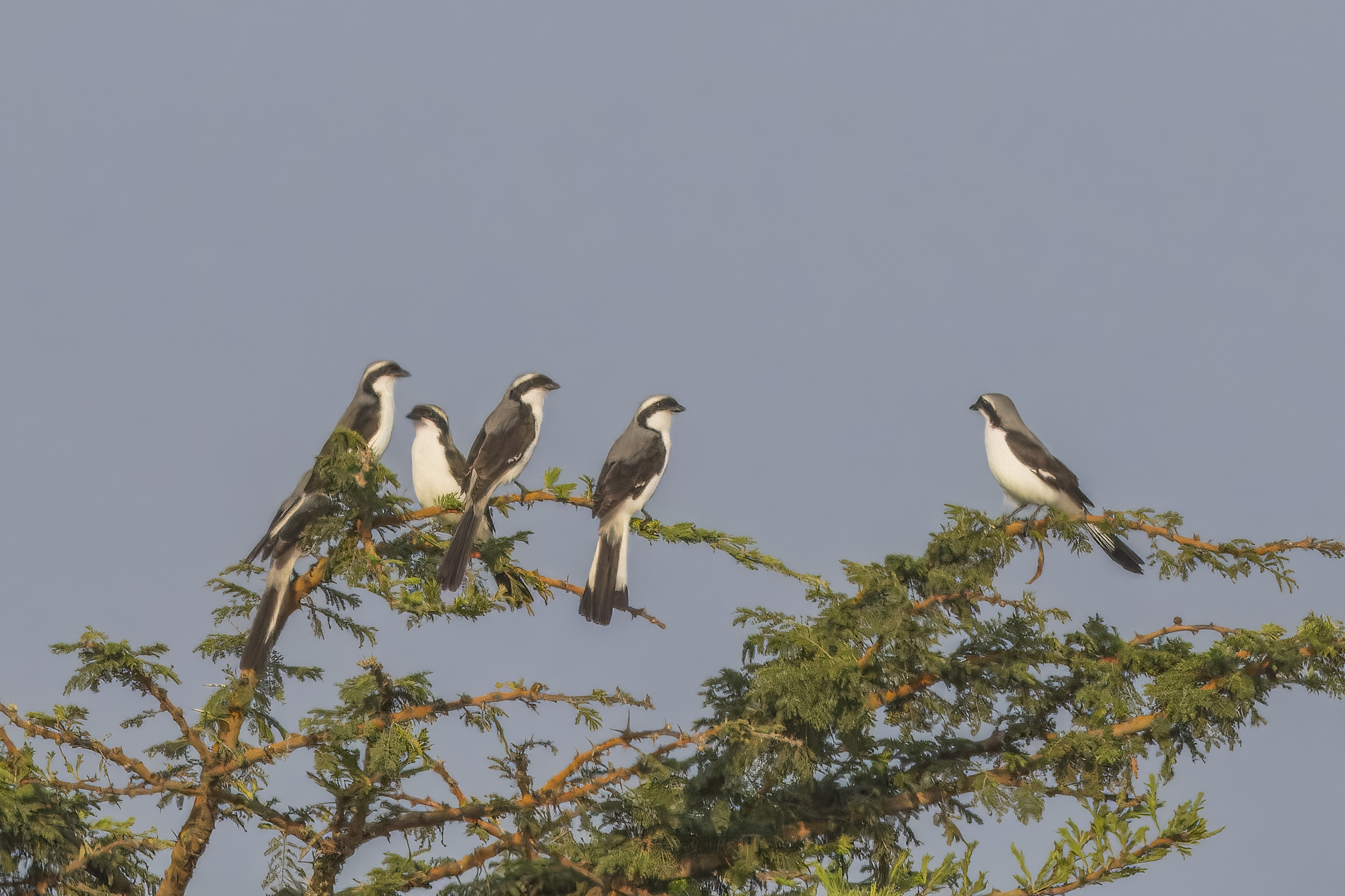

== Ecology ==
The grey-backed fiscal is a sociable bird and is often found in wooded grassland, gardens and damp acacia scrub. It is often seen in pairs or small groups on tree stumps, wires and branches, engaged in wing fluttering, tail waving and noisy babble. It is a gregarious, cooperative breeder. Nests are built up to 10 m (33 ft) off the ground, near the trunk of the tree or on peripheral branches. The female builds the nest while the male may bring nesting materials and food for the female. A clutch of about four eggs is laid. Incubation is done by the female and lasts about fourteen days, while the young remains in the nest for a further twenty days.

== Status ==
The grey-backed fiscal has a wide range and a large total population. It is a common bird and the International Union for Conservation of Nature has assessed its conservation status as being of "least concern".
