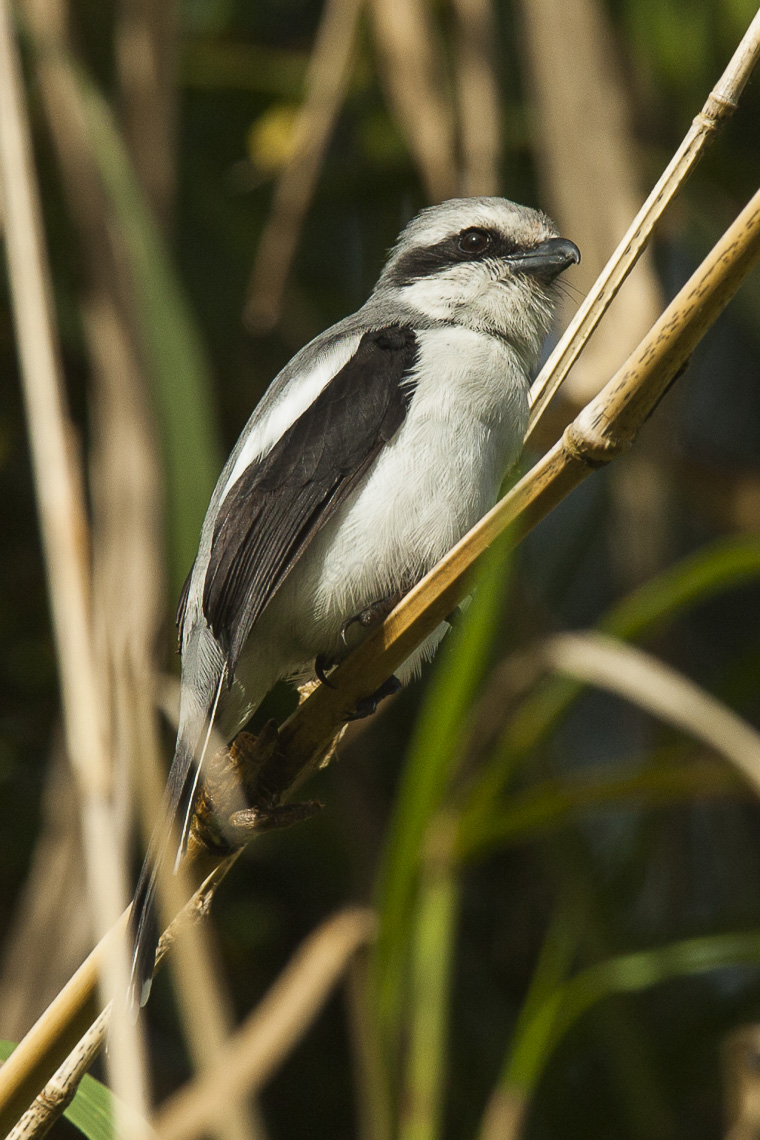

Conservation status
- Least Concern (IUCN 3.1)

Scientific classification
- Kingdom: Animalia
- Phylum: Chordata
- Class: Aves
- Order: Passeriformes
- Family: Laniidae
- Genus: Lanius
- Species: L. mackinnoni

Binomial name
- Lanius mackinnoni Sharpe, 1891

= Mackinnon's shrike =

Species of bird

Mackinnon's shrike (Lanius mackinnoni), also called Mackinnon's fiscal, is a songbird species of the family Laniidae. Its natural habitats are subtropical or tropical moist montane forests and moist savanna. It is not considered a threatened species by the IUCN.The population of this species is increasing, which is thought to be due to the degradation of nearby habitat. Its common name and Latin binomial commemorate Archibald Donald MacKinnon.

== Description ==
Mackinnon's shrike grows to a length of about 20 cm (8 in). The adult male has a greyish-black head and mantle, a white supercilium, white scapulars and black wings. The tail is black with white margins and the underparts are white, sometimes tinged with buff. The female is similar except for having rufous patches on the flanks. The juvenile is greyish-brown and heavily barred.

== Distribution and habitat ==
Mackinnon's fiscal is found in tropical humid parts of Central Africa. It has a disjunct range (from the Obudu Plateau to northern Angola on one hand and across northern Congo, the Ruwenzori and Lake Victoria regions on the other). It is found in forest edges, clearings, secondary growth and bushy areas, from sea level up to about 2,200 m (7,200 ft).

== Status ==
Mackinnon's fiscal has a very wide range and has been described as locally common, although rather more scarce in the eastern end of its range. Its population trend may be upward because it is thought to have benefited from deforestation as it thrives in secondary growth and is often to be found in farmland, villages and gardens. The International Union for Conservation of Nature has assessed its conservation status as being of "least concern".
