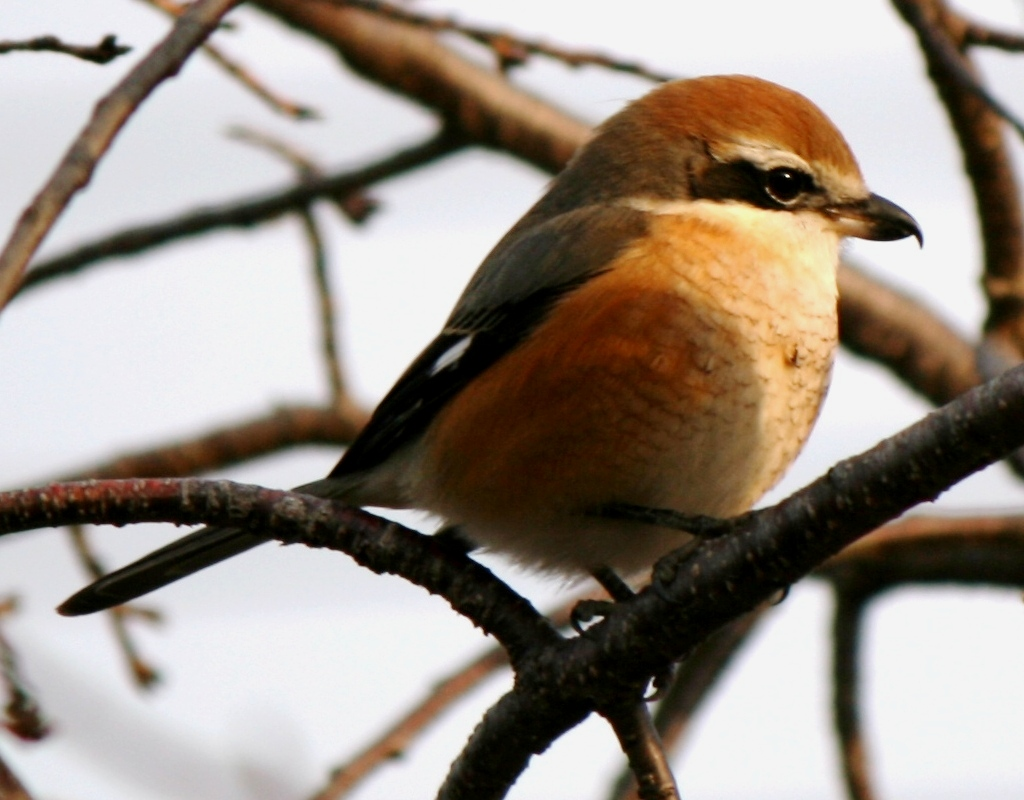

Conservation status
- Least Concern (IUCN 3.1)

Scientific classification
- Kingdom: Animalia
- Phylum: Chordata
- Class: Aves
- Order: Passeriformes
- Family: Laniidae
- Genus: Lanius
- Species: L. bucephalus

Binomial name
- Lanius bucephalus Temminck & Schlegel, 1845

= Bull-headed shrike =

Species of bird

The bull-headed shrike (Lanius bucephalus) is a passerine bird of eastern Asia belonging to the shrike family Laniidae.

It is 19–20 cm (approx. 7.48-7.9 inches) long. The male has a brown crown, white eyebrow and black mask. The back is grey-brown while the wings are dark with a white patch. The flanks are rufous and the rest of the underparts are whitish with fine barring. Females are similar but duller and browner with a brown mask and no white wing-patch. The species has harsh grating and chattering calls and will also mimic other birds.

It breeds in north-east China, Korea, Japan and far-eastern Russia (Ussuriland, Sakhalin and the Kuril Islands). Northern birds migrate south for the winter with a few reaching southern China. Vagrants have been recorded in Taiwan, Hong Kong and Vietnam. The isolated race sicarius is found only in the mountains of Gansu Province in west-central China.

Open habitats such as farmland and woodland edges are preferred. It also visits parks and gardens in urban areas. It sits on a prominent perch, waiting for prey to pass by. It feeds mainly on insects such as beetles and crickets but also preys on lizards and crustaceans.

With some other species from the Lanius genus, like the great grey shrike (Lanius excubitor), the bull-headed shrike is known to impale some of its preys upon a sharp point – usually thorns – so the food can be ripped into bite-sized pieces more easily. It may also do this to cache food and to mark a territory boundary.

The nest is built among bushes or bamboo. Two to six eggs are laid. They are incubated for 14 to 15 days and the young birds fledge 14 days after hatching.
