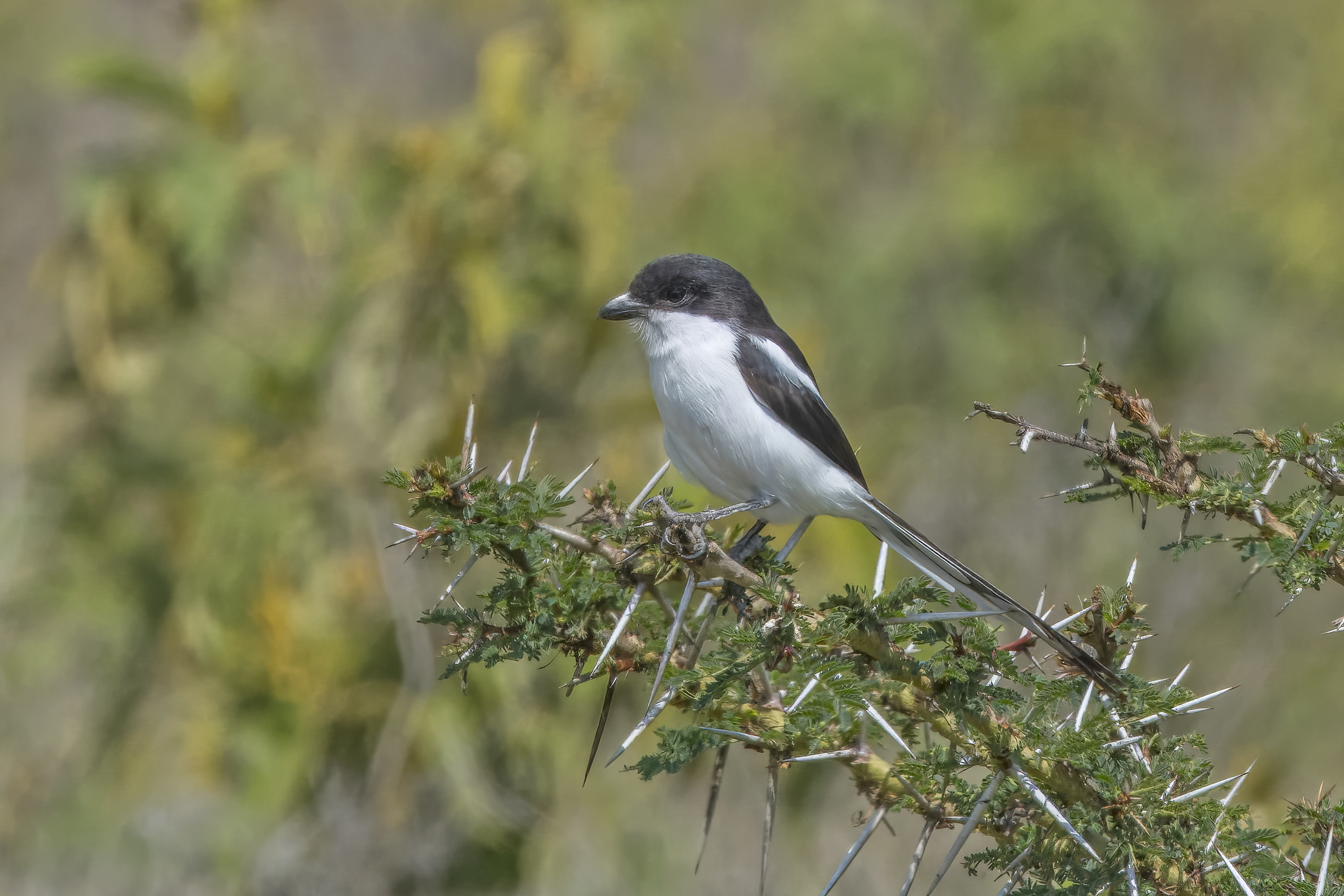
- Adult male L. h. humeralis

Scientific classification
- Kingdom: Animalia
- Phylum: Chordata
- Class: Aves
- Order: Passeriformes
- Family: Laniidae
- Genus: Lanius
- Species: L. humeralis

Binomial name
- Lanius humeralis Stanley, 1814

Subspecies
- 3, see text

= Northern fiscal =

Species of bird

The northern fiscal (Lanius humeralis) is a member of the shrike family found through most of Sub-Saharan Africa. It used to be grouped with the southern fiscal (Lanius collaris). Together they were called the common fiscal. The fiscal gets its English and Afrikaans common names from its black and white 'suit-and-tie' appearance reminiscent of the taxman (‘fiscal’).

== Identification ==
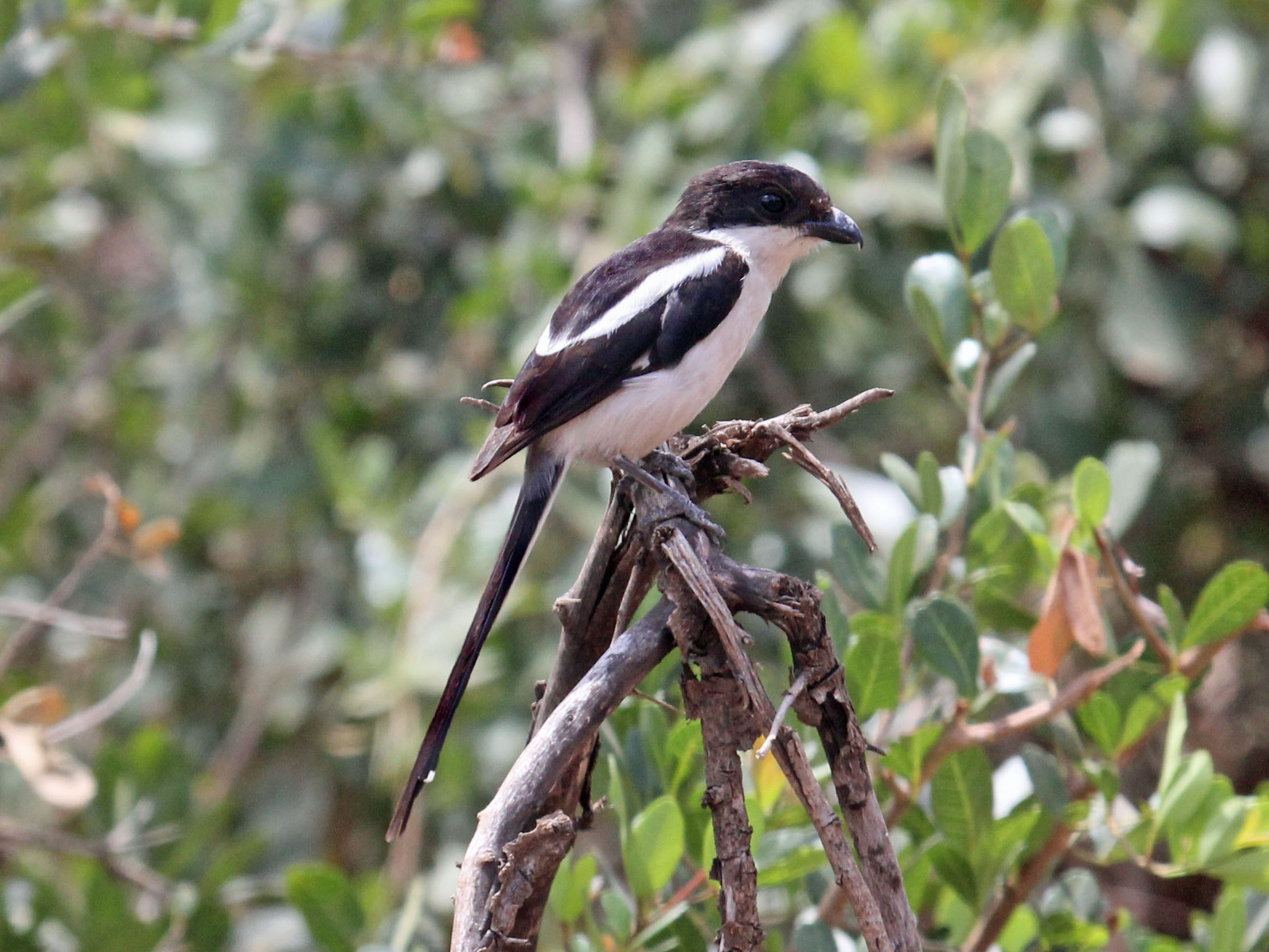
Exhibiting the white 'V' on the back

This is a fairly distinctive 21–23 cm long passerine with white underparts and black upperparts extending from the top of the head down to the tail. The bird has a characteristic white 'V' on the back and a relatively long black tail with white outer feathers and white tips on the other feathers. The bill, eyes and legs are black. Adult male and female northern fiscals are quite similar except for the rufous lower flank of the female.

== Subspecies ==
Listed alphabetically.

- L. h. capelli (Bocage, 1879) – S Gabon and S PRCongo E to S DRCongo, extreme SW Uganda, Rwanda and Burundi, and S to Angola
- L. h. humeralis Stanley, 1814 – C Eritrea, C & S Ethiopia, SE South Sudan, E Uganda, W Kenya, Tanzania, N Malawi, and N Mozambique; probably also NE Zambia
- L. h. smithii (Fraser, 1843) – S Mauritania (rare), S Mali (rare) and from S Guinea, Sierra Leone and Liberia E to Central African Republic, N PRCongo, SW South Sudan, and W Uganda

== Habits ==
The northern fiscal is usually solitary and hunts insects and small rodents from an exposed perch or the tops of shrubs. Territorial size is directly related to the density of hunting perches. Installing more artificial perches causes the fiscal to reduce its territory size and allow more birds in the affected range.

== Habitat ==
The northern fiscal lives in a wide range of habitats from grassland with fences for perching to acacia thornveld or even woodland, but avoids very dense habitats where its hunting would be impaired.

== Call ==
It gives a jumbled mix of shrike-like swizzling sounds including some imitations and a harsh Dzzzttt-dzzzt-dzzzt alarm call.
