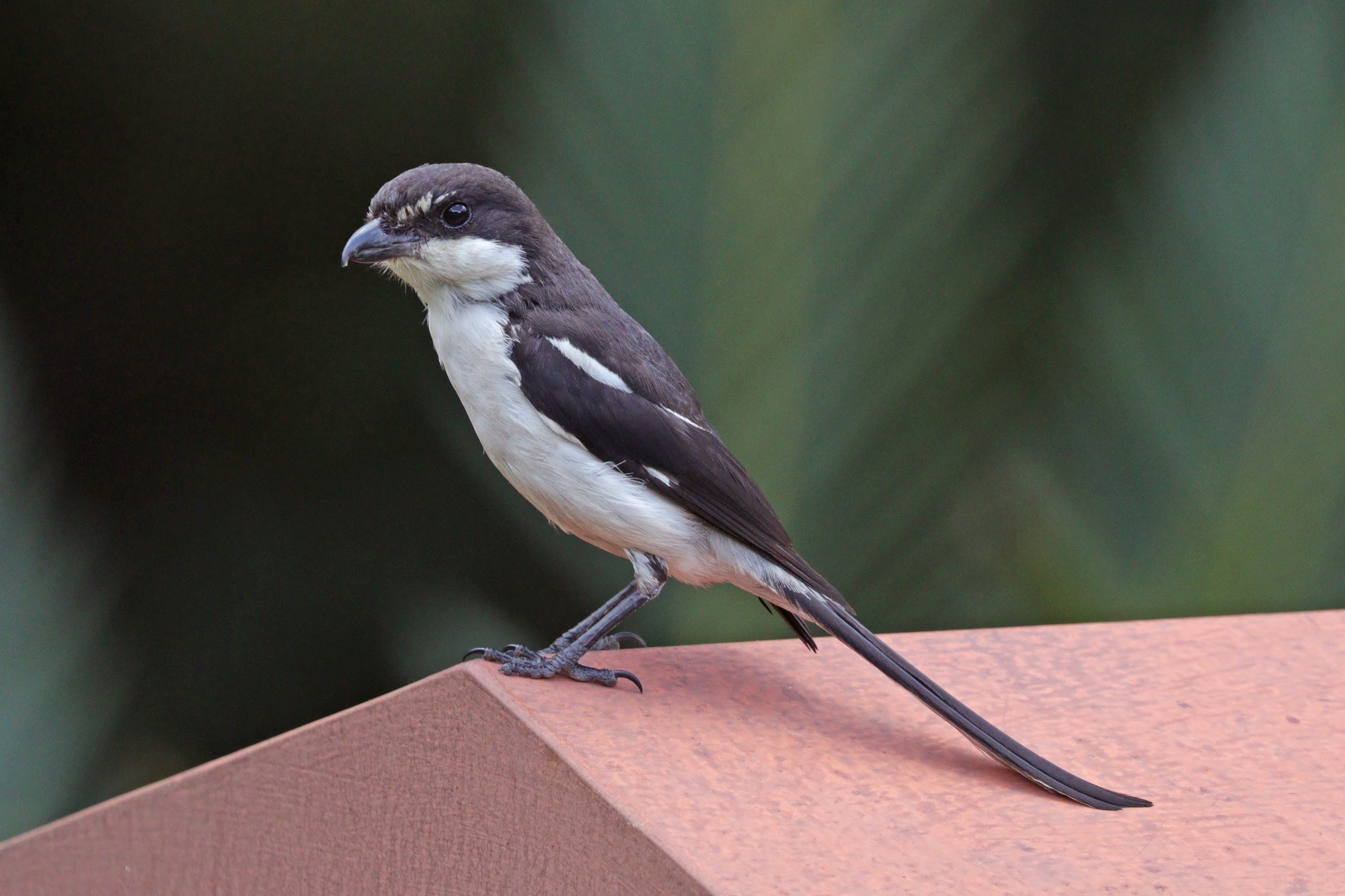
- L. c. subcoronatus in Walter Sisulu Botanical Garden in Roodepoort

Conservation status
- Least Concern (IUCN 3.1)

Scientific classification
- Kingdom: Animalia
- Phylum: Chordata
- Class: Aves
- Order: Passeriformes
- Family: Laniidae
- Genus: Lanius
- Species: L. collaris

Binomial name
- Lanius collaris Linnaeus, 1766

Subspecies
- See text

= Southern fiscal =

Species of bird

The southern fiscal or fiscal shrike (Lanius collaris) is a member of the shrike family found through most of southern Africa. It is also sometimes named jackie hangman or butcher bird due to its habit of impaling its prey on acacia thorns to store the food for later consumption. It was previously lumped together with the northern fiscal (Lanius humeralis). Together they were known as the common fiscal.

== Taxonomy ==
In 1760 the French zoologist Mathurin Jacques Brisson included a description of the southern fiscal in his Ornithologie based on a specimen collected from the Cape of Good Hope in South Africa. He used the French name La pie-griesche du Cap de Bonne Espérance and the Latin Lanius capitis Bonae Spei. Although Brisson coined Latin names, these do not conform to the binomial system and are not recognised by the International Commission on Zoological Nomenclature. When in 1766 the Swedish naturalist Carl Linnaeus updated his Systema Naturae for the twelfth edition, he added 240 species that had been previously described by Brisson. One of these was the southern fiscal. Linnaeus included a brief description, coined the current binomial name Lanius collaris and cited Brisson's work. The specific name collaris is Latin for "of the neck".

Five subspecies are recognised.

- L. c. aridicolus Clancey, 1955 – south western Angola and north western Namibia (dune-fog zone of the Namib Desert)
- L. c. collaris Linnaeus, 1766 – extreme southern Namibia, southern, central and eastern South Africa, Eswatini, Lesotho, and extreme southern Mozambique (Maputo)(except the south), Zambia, northern Botswana, and possibly also extreme south western Tanzania and extreme north eastern Namibia
- L. c. marwitzi Reichenow, 1901 Uhehe fiscal – north eastern, central and south eastern Tanzania, northern Malawi
- L. c. pyrrhostictus Holub & Pelzeln, 1882 – extreme north eastern Botswana (around Basuto), southern Zimbabwe (south of Harare), north eastern and eastern South Africa (Limpopo and Mpumalanga), and south western Mozambique (almost restricted to Gaza province)
- L. c. subcoronatus A. Smith, 1841 – extreme south east Angola, Namibia (excluding the coastal north west and extreme south), Botswana, south western Zimbabwe, and northern South Africa (south to north western Northern Cape and central Free State)

== Description ==
This is a fairly distinctive 21–23-cm long passerine with white underparts and black upperparts extending from the top of the head down to the tail. The bird has a characteristic white "V" on the back and a relatively long black tail with white outer feathers and white tips on the other feathers. The bill, eyes and legs are black. Adult male and female common fiscals are quite similar except for the rufous lower flank of the female.

The calls are a jumbled mix of shrike-like swizzling sounds including some imitations and a harsh Dzzzttt-dzzzt-dzzzt alarm call. Most of those calls however are either threatening or alarm calls. The species sometimes produces a surprisingly sweet, quiet song, although such song, however sweet it sounds, generally is either territorial or pair-bonding in function.

== Distribution and habitat ==
The southern fiscal lives in a wide range of habitats from grassland with fences for perching to acacia thornveld or even woodland, but avoids very dense habitats where its hunting would be impaired.

Southern fiscals can encounter cold temperatures in the winter and in high-altitude environments. To cope with these cold temperatures, fiscal shrikes undergo seasonal changes in body temperature, oxygen consumption, and evaporative water loss in order to conserve energy. At lower altitudes, the shrikes have higher basal metabolic rates, evaporative water loss, and body temperatures compared to shrikes in higher altitude environments. In the winter, basal metabolic rate and oxygen consumption are increased while body temperature is decreased.

== Behaviour ==
The southern fiscal is usually solitary and hunts insects and small rodents from an exposed perch or the tops of shrubs. Territorial size is directly related to the density of hunting perches. Installing more artificial perches causes the fiscal to reduce its territory size and allow more birds in the affected range.

In eastern Africa, the southern fiscal is a major predator of the plain tiger butterfly.

Along with adjusting their physiology, southern fiscals also adjust their hunting methods at different times of year in response to seasonal changes in food demand. During the summer, the shrikes hunted from an hour before sunrise to right before sunset. During the winter, hunting only occurred from daytime to sunset, so the shrikes increased their attack and capture rates, and they also captured larger prey. Prey length, handling time, and attack time increased with altitude.

== Gallery ==
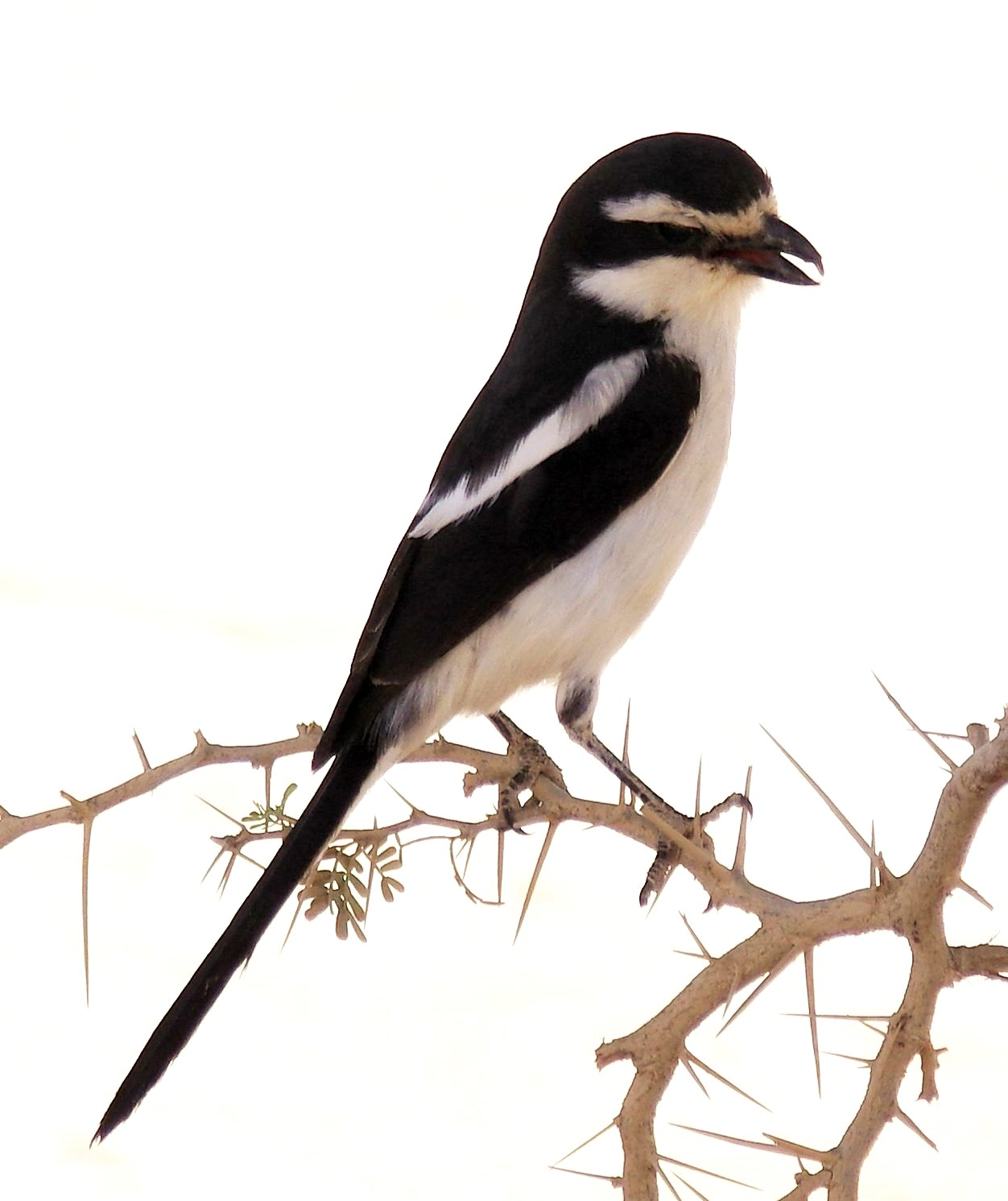
L. c. aridicolus Clancey, 1955 — native to the Namib desert

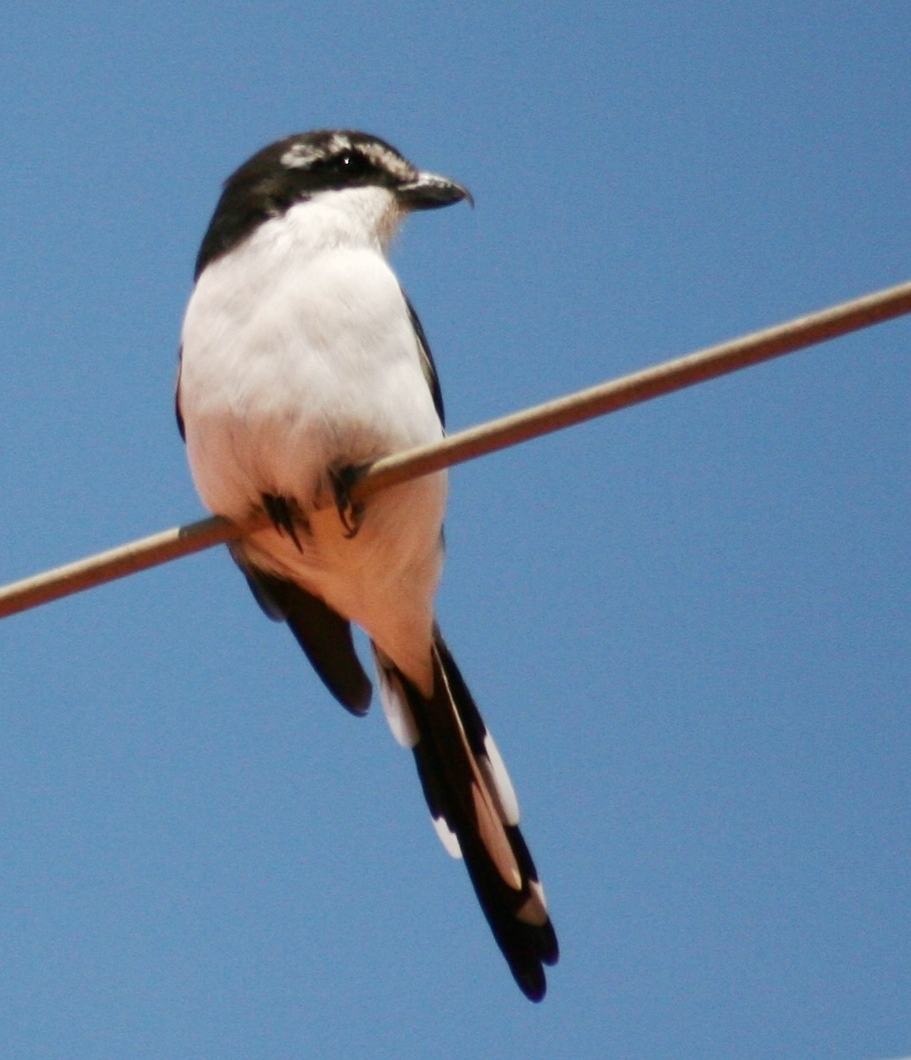
L. c. subcoronatus A.Smith, 1841 — native to interior of southern Africa

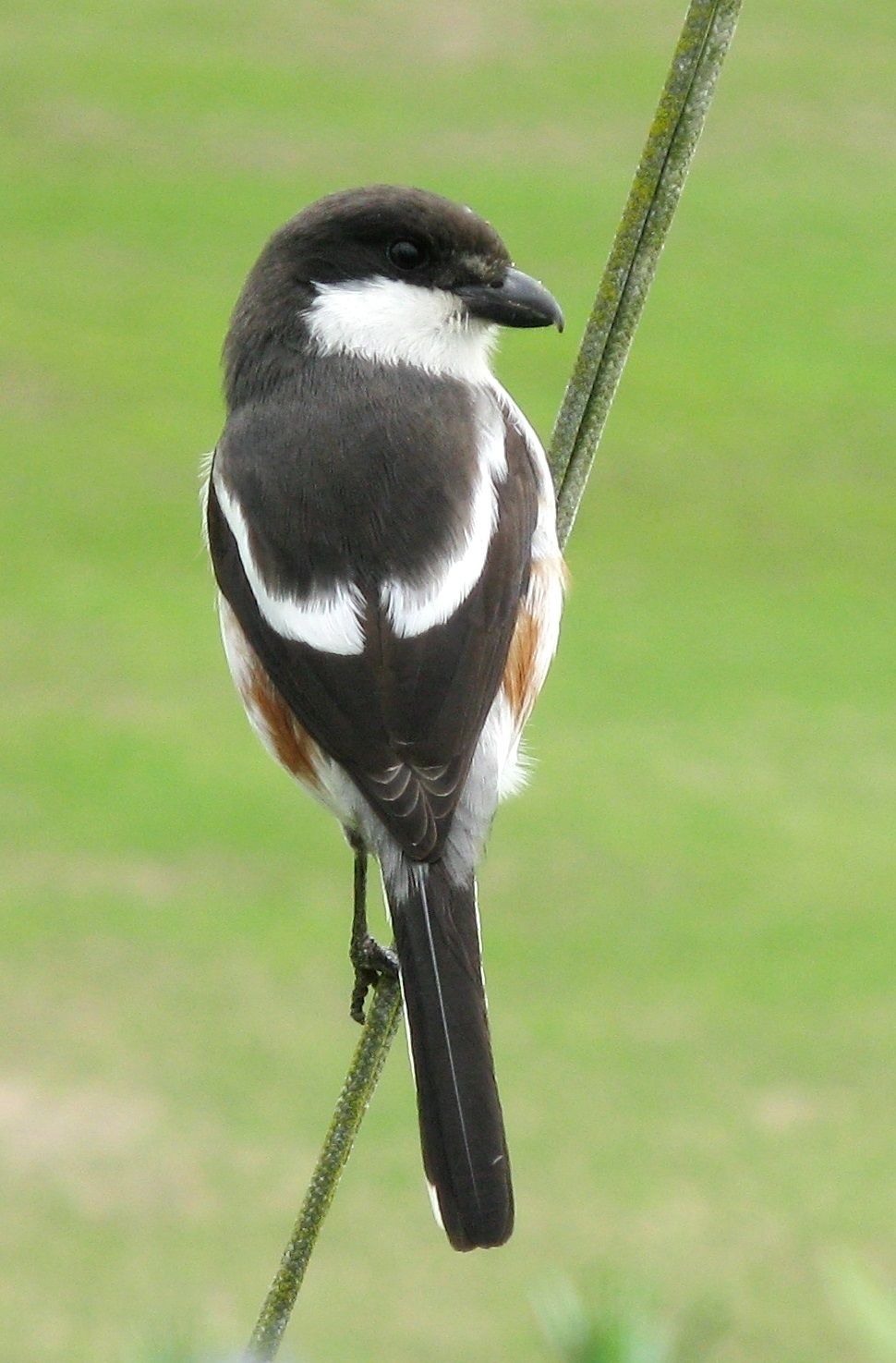
L. c. collaris female, showing rufous flanks and white scapulars

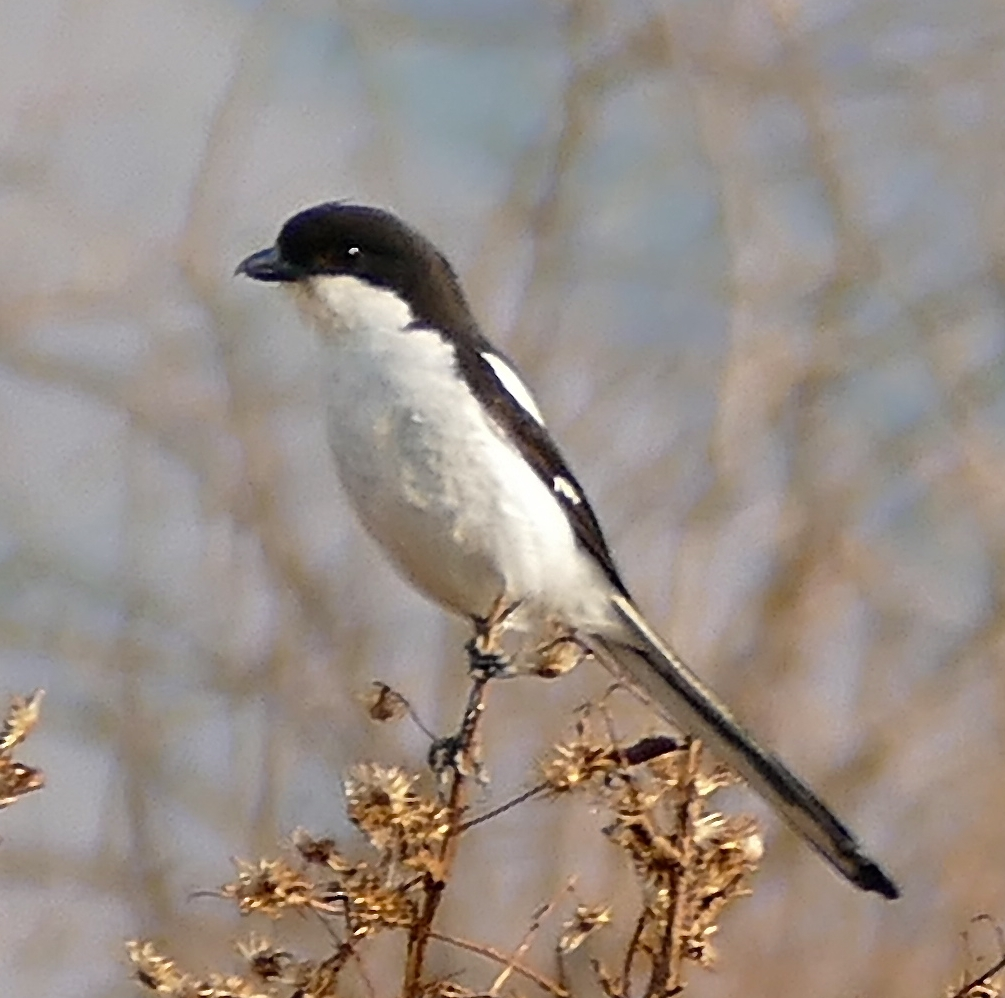
L. c. predator Clancey, 1953 — in part lumped with the nominate subsp.

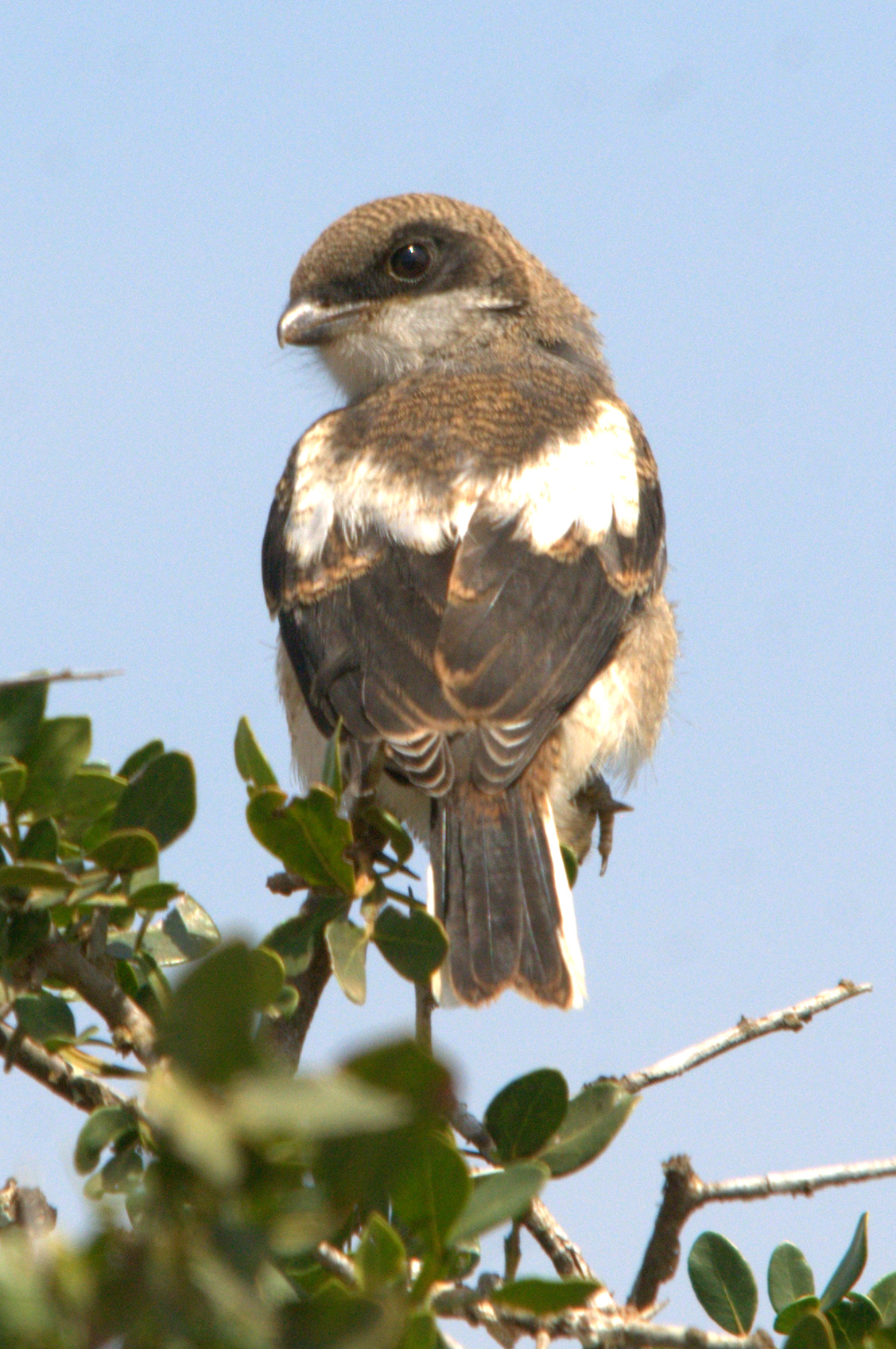
L. c. collaris juvenile with brown, grizzled plumage, still under care of adult

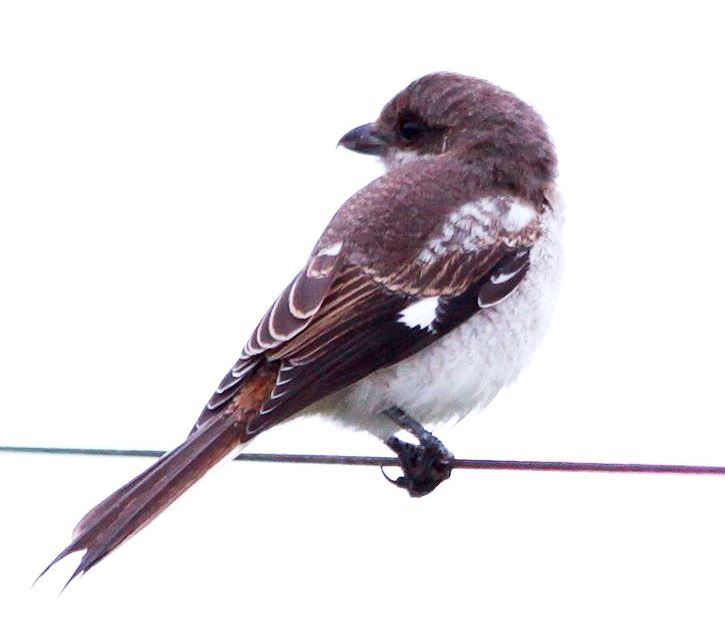
L. c. collaris juvenile with barred scapular feathers and pointed rectrices
