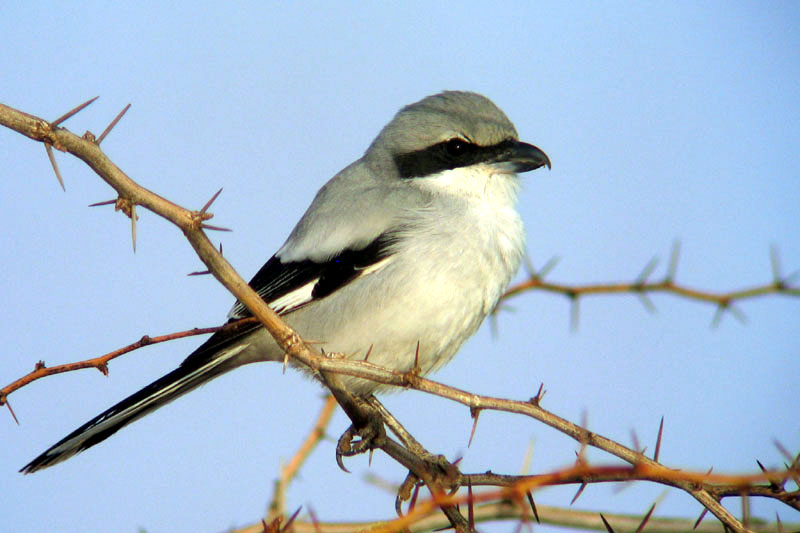
- An individual in Oman

Scientific classification
- Kingdom: Animalia
- Phylum: Chordata
- Class: Aves
- Order: Passeriformes
- Family: Laniidae
- Genus: Lanius
- Species: L. excubitor
- Subspecies: L. e. aucheri

Trinomial name
- Lanius excubitor aucheri Bonaparte, 1852.

Synonyms
- Lanius meridonialis aucheri

= Arabian great shrike =

Arabian Great Shrike

Subspecies of bird

The Arabian great shrike (Lanius excubitor aucheri) is a non-migratory subspecies of the great grey shrike found mainly in the Arabian Peninsula. Formerly considered a subspecies of the southern grey shrike (Lanius meridionalis) complex, it is now classified as a subspecies of the great grey shrike.

== Taxonomy ==
The taxon was formally described by Charles Lucien Bonaparte in 1852 with a protonym, Lanius aucheri. He then merged it into a different taxon, as subspecies of the Southern grey shrike, Lanius meridionalis with its type locality as “Persia”.

A brief entry was written about the shrike, in which it is compared to the now conspecific Lanius excubitor: "similar to the preceding, in the middle, as it were, between the thorax and the watchman and the back without white; longer tail, narrow, and with the less white flight feathers in different ways: very short secondary flight feathers!"

Following several generic evaluations, including a study of mitochondrial DNA, it was discovered that the southern grey shrike complex was paraphyletic, and nine subspecies (algeriensis, koenigi, elegans, leucopygos, aucheri, lathora, pallidirostris, buryi and uncinatus) including the Arabian shrike were reclassified, being merged into the great grey shrike species. Consequently, the term “southern grey shrike” was rendered obsolete and ceased to exist. One last subspecies, Lanius meridionalis ssp. meridionalis was elevated to full species status and is endemic to the Iberian Peninsula.

The subspecies name Aucher derives from the name "Aucher", who was considered to be the former authority on this taxon.

== Description ==
It has uniform grey upper parts that remain constant throughout its body. There is a white band across each upper part of the wings, however on the secondary inner wings any white patterns are almost absent. The wing pattern is said to be variable (Ali & Ripley 2001). White colouration is reduced on the wings and tail, which is not the case on similar subspecies. It is relatively large, reaching a length of about 25 centimetres.

== Distribution ==
It inhabits the Arabian Peninsula, as well as much of Iran. It is found in Eastern Egypt and Sudan, as well as parts of Eritrea.
