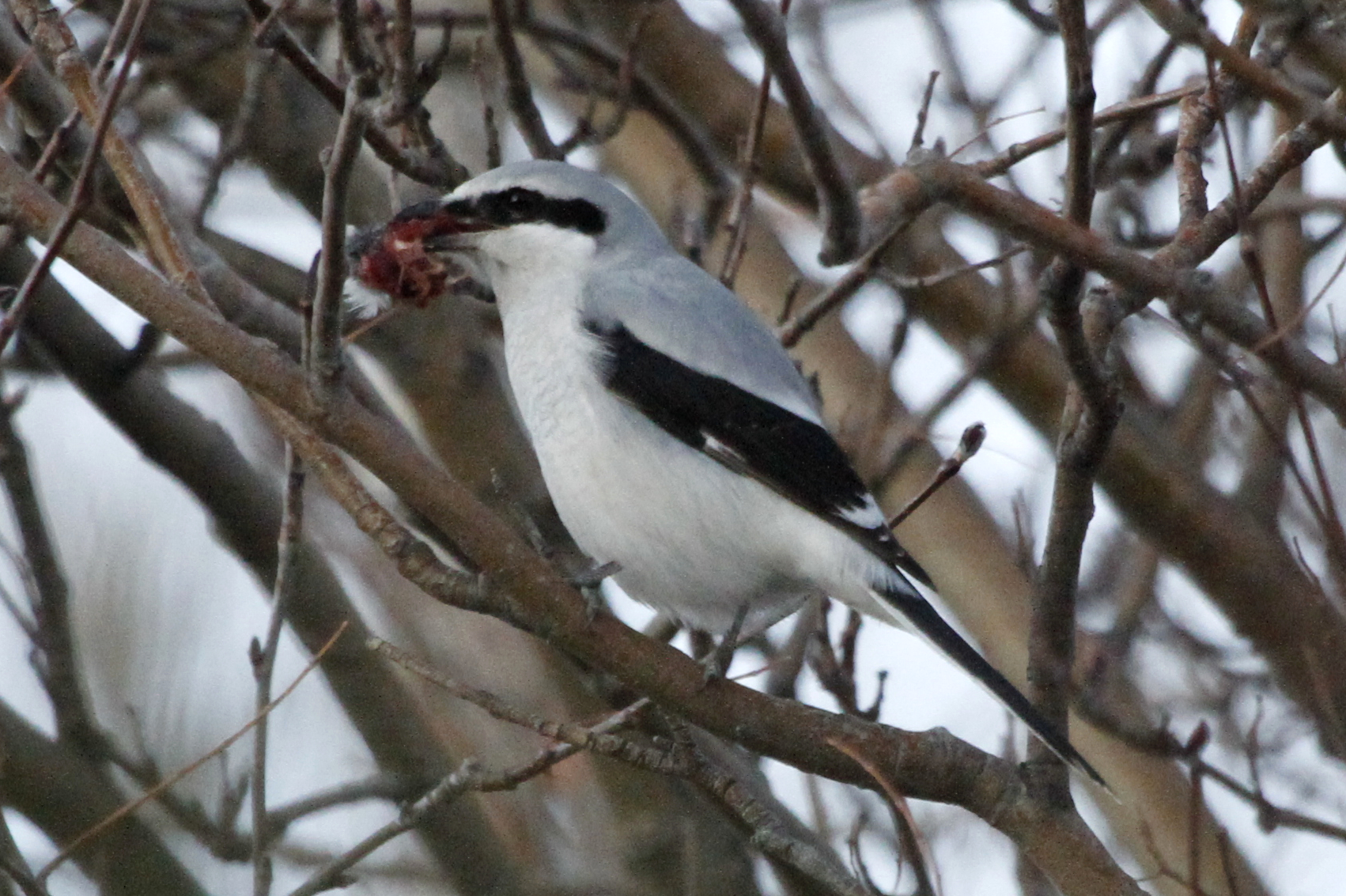

Conservation status
- Least Concern (IUCN 3.1)

Scientific classification
- Kingdom: Animalia
- Phylum: Chordata
- Class: Aves
- Order: Passeriformes
- Family: Laniidae
- Genus: Lanius
- Species: L. borealis

Binomial name
- Lanius borealis Vieillot, 1808

Subspecies
- 6 sspp, see text

= Northern shrike =

Species of bird

The northern shrike (Lanius borealis) is a large songbird species in the shrike family (Laniidae) native to North America and Siberia. Long considered a subspecies of the great grey shrike, it was classified as a distinct species in 2017. Six subspecies are recognised.

== Taxonomy ==
The northern shrike was formally described by the French ornithologist Louis Pierre Vieillot in 1808 under its present binomial name Lanius borealis. In the 19th century, North American ornithologists considered it as a separate species from the great grey shrike, while European authorities held them to be the same species. American ornithologist Alden H. Miller investigated differences between the Siberian and Alaskan populations in 1930 and could find no consistent differences, hence he recommended combining the two into Lanius excubitor.

In North America, this and the related loggerhead shrike are commonly known as butcherbirds for their habit of impaling prey on thorns or spikes. A folk name from Michigan is winter butcherbird. The Vuntut Gwitchin First Nation people of Old Crow, Yukon call it Tzi kwut go katshi lyi. As a passerine, or song bird, it has no talons. It has the hooked beak of a raptor.

A 2010 study of mitochondrial DNA found that the northern shrike was most closely related to the Iberian grey shrike (Lanius meridionalis), the steppe grey shrike (Lanius pallidirostris), and the two formed a clade along with the Chinese grey shrike and loggerhead shrike.

=== Subspecies ===
East Eurasian group

- Lanius borealis sibiricus – eastern Siberia to northern Mongolia

Browner above than excubitor, distinct but delicate banding below. Some white on primary bases only.

- Lanius borealis bianchii – Sakhalin and possibly southern Kuril Islands

Smaller and paler than sibiricus, banding below pale and indistinct. Some white on primary bases only.

- Lanius borealis mollis – Russian Altai Mountains, north western Mongolia

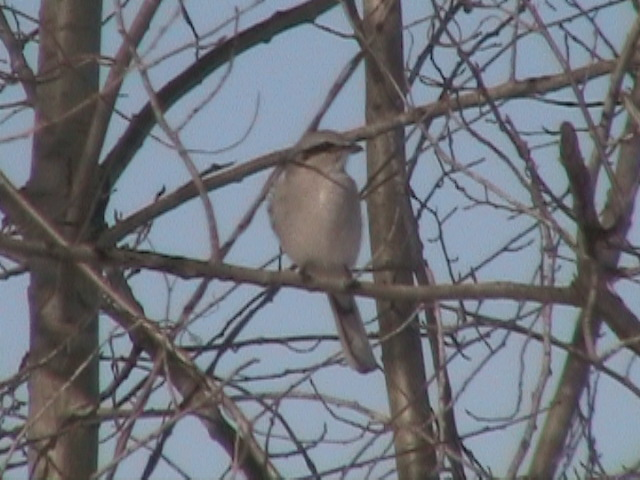
Northern shrike wintering in Scarborough Marsh (Cumberland County, Maine, United States)

Browner than sibiricus above, banding below well-developed. Little white on primary bases.

- Lanius borealis funereus – Tian Shan and western China

Large; quite dark and brownish, below bluish-grey with almost black banding. Little white on primary bases.

North American group

- Lanius borealis borealis – Hudson Bay region of Ontario and Quebec

Similar to excubitor, but darker with faint barring below. John James Audubon called this subspecies the great American shrike in his book Birds of America.

- Lanius borealis invictus – northern Alberta west to northern Alaska, perhaps also Chukchi Peninsula region in extreme north east Siberia

Larger and paler than borealis, paralleling homeyeri compared to excubitor.

== Description ==
The loggerhead shrike can be distinguished from the northern shrike by its smaller size, darker grey plumage and larger black face mask that covers the eye completely. It also has a shorter bill with less prominent hook. Their calls are similar.

Measurements:

- Length: 9.1–9.4 in (23–24 cm)
- Weight: 2.0–2.8 oz (57–79 g)
- Wingspan: 11.8–13.8 in (30–35 cm)

== Distribution and habitat ==
The northern shrike breeds in taiga and tundra from Labrador west through Alaska (including some Aleutian Islands) to western Siberia, and south to extreme northwestern China, northern Mongolia, and James Bay. It breeds in forest edge habitats wherever suitable trees or shrubs are present and has nested in white spruce, black spruce, felt-leaf willow, mountain alders, and poplars. The northern limit of its breeding range is defined by the presence of 1-2 meter high shrubby willows.

Northern shrikes are irruptive in the non-breeding season. Some stay year-round in this breeding range, but most move south depending on the severity of the winter, food supply, and competition from other shrikes. They will go as far south as northeastern China and Japan in Asia and irregularly as far south as New Mexico, Kansas, Illinois, Ohio, Pennsylvania, and New Jersey. On their wintering grounds, they prefer open country, including forest edges, prairies, agricultural land, savannas, and coastal marshes.

Observations of wintering habitats in Idaho suggest suitable wintering territories are in demand, as northern shrikes that died in a particular area were quickly replaced.

== Feeding ==
Northern shrikes often sit on tall poles and branches surveying for food. They prey on arthropods such as spiders, beetles, bugs, and grasshoppers, and small vertebrates. Prey identified include passerine birds such as horned lark, black-capped chickadee, common starling, brewer's sparrow, white-crowned sparrow, dark-eyed junco, pine siskin, house sparrow, small mammals such as the vagrant shrew, western harvest mouse, deer mouse, long-tailed vole, meadow vole and house mouse, and reptiles such as spiny lizards. They have been observed hunting finches and house sparrows at bird feeders. They are known to lure small birds by imitating their calls.
