= Southern grey shrike =

The southern grey shrike is a former species of shrike that has been split or reassigned to the following:

- some southern subspecies of the great grey shrike, Lanius excubitor
- Iberian grey shrike, Lanius meridionalis
- Steppe grey shrike, Lanius pallidirostris
