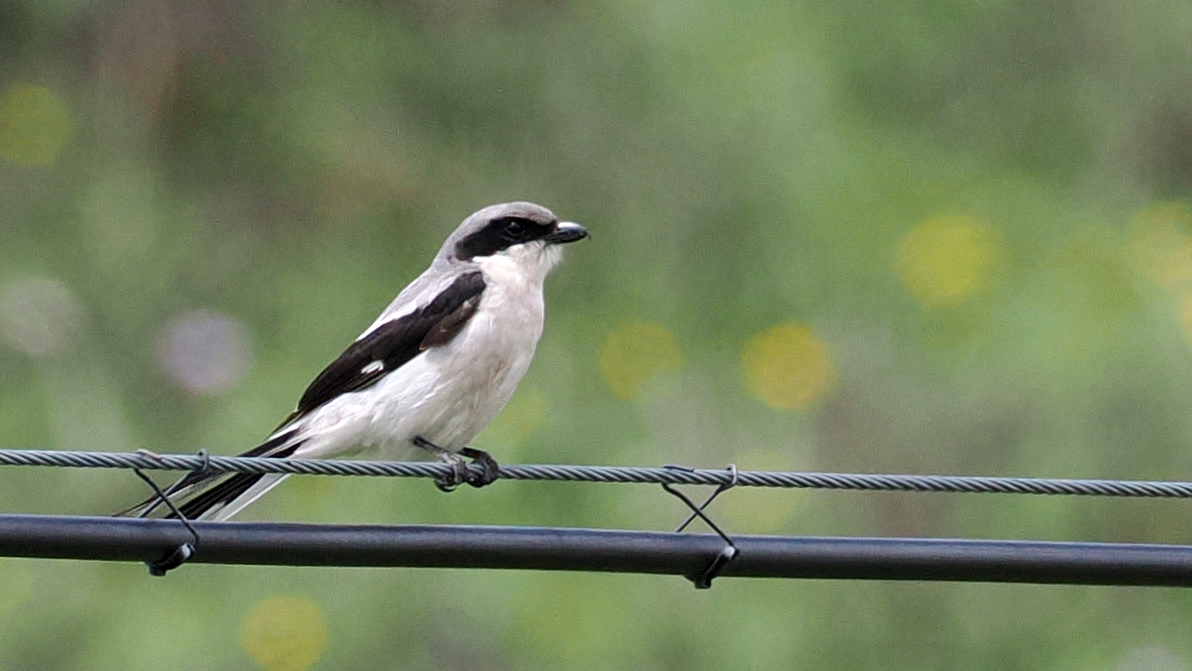

Conservation status
- Least Concern (IUCN 3.1)

Scientific classification
- Kingdom: Animalia
- Phylum: Chordata
- Class: Aves
- Order: Passeriformes
- Family: Laniidae
- Genus: Lanius
- Species: L. giganteus

Binomial name
- Lanius giganteus Przewalski, 1887
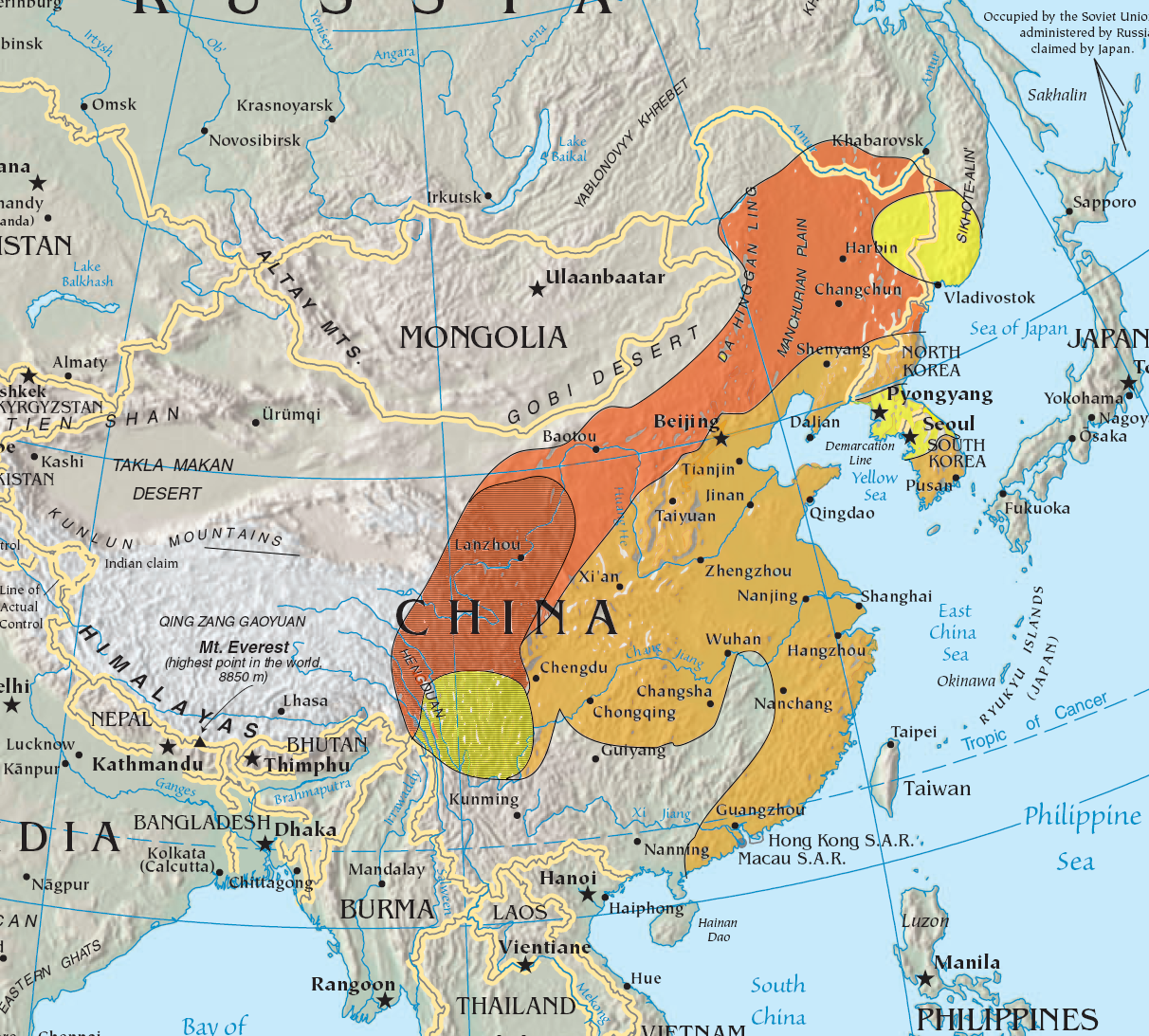
- Native range in dark yellow and dark orange, rest of range belongs to L. sphenocercus

= Giant grey shrike =

Species of bird

The giant grey shrike (Lanius giganteus) is a species of bird in the family Laniidae. It is found in China. Its natural habitat is temperate forests. It was formerly considered a subspecies of the Chinese grey shrike (Lanius sphenocercus), but was split as a distinct species by the IOC in 2021.
