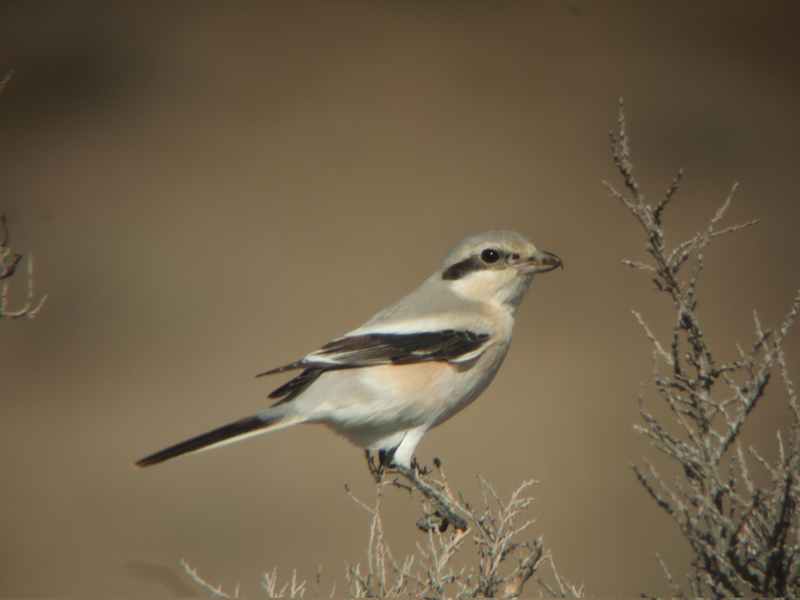
- In southern Kazakhstan

Scientific classification
- Kingdom: Animalia
- Phylum: Chordata
- Class: Aves
- Order: Passeriformes
- Family: Laniidae
- Genus: Lanius
- Species: L. excubitor
- Subspecies: L. e. pallidirostris

Trinomial name
- Lanius excubitor pallidirostris Cassin, 1851

Synonyms
- Lanius meridionalis pallidirostris; Lanius pallidirostris

= Steppe grey shrike =

Large songbird subspecies in the shrike family

The steppe grey shrike (Lanius excubitor pallidirostris) is a subspecies of songbird in the shrike family (Laniidae) native to Central Asia and parts of northern China, Iran, Afghanistan and Pakistan. Formerly considered either a species in its own right or a subspecies of the southern grey shrike (Lanius meridionalis) complex, it is now classified as a subspecies of the great grey shrike.

== Taxonomy ==
The steppe grey shrike was described by the American ornithologist John Cassin in 1851 under the binomial name Lanius pallidirostris. The generic Lanius is Latin for a "butcher" and the specific pallidirostris combines the Latin pallidus for "pale" and -rostris for "billed".

It differs from the nominate subspecies of great grey shrike in being slightly longer-winged and shorter-tailed, and with more extensive white on the primaries. The pale bill from which it was described, only applies to juvenile and first-winter birds; adults have a black bill and lores similar to nominate L. e. excubitor.

== Description ==
A medium-sized shrike, 23–24 cm long, resembling its parent species, the great grey shrike, but slightly smaller, with a shorter and narrower tail and a lighter overall grey colour. Because it is migratory, its wings are longer with longer primary projection than those of the greater grey shrike. It has large, prominent white spots on the scapula and at the base of the limbs, and the white edges of the tail are very extensive. The bill has a light base with a dark tip.
