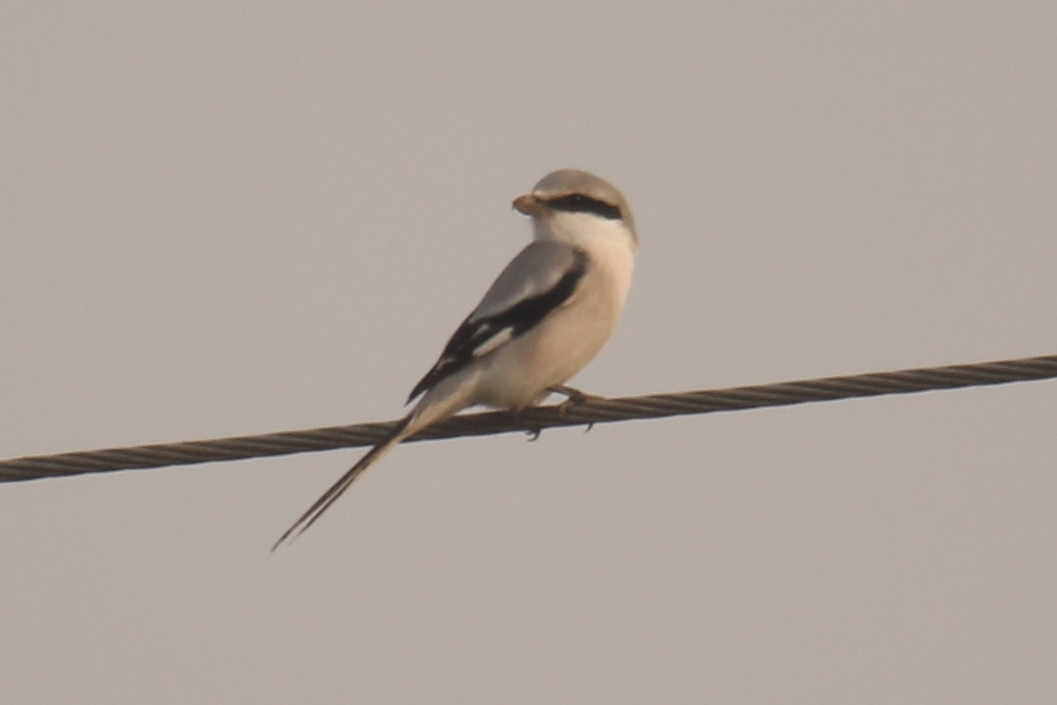

Conservation status
- Least Concern (IUCN 3.1)

Scientific classification
- Kingdom: Animalia
- Phylum: Chordata
- Class: Aves
- Order: Passeriformes
- Family: Laniidae
- Genus: Lanius
- Species: L. sphenocercus

Binomial name
- Lanius sphenocercus Cabanis, 1873

= Chinese grey shrike =

Species of bird

The Chinese grey shrike (Lanius sphenocercus) is a species of bird in the family Laniidae. It is found in China, Japan, North Korea, South Korea, Mongolia, and the Russian Far East. Its natural habitat is temperate forests. The giant grey shrike (L. giganteus) of central China was formerly considered a subspecies.
