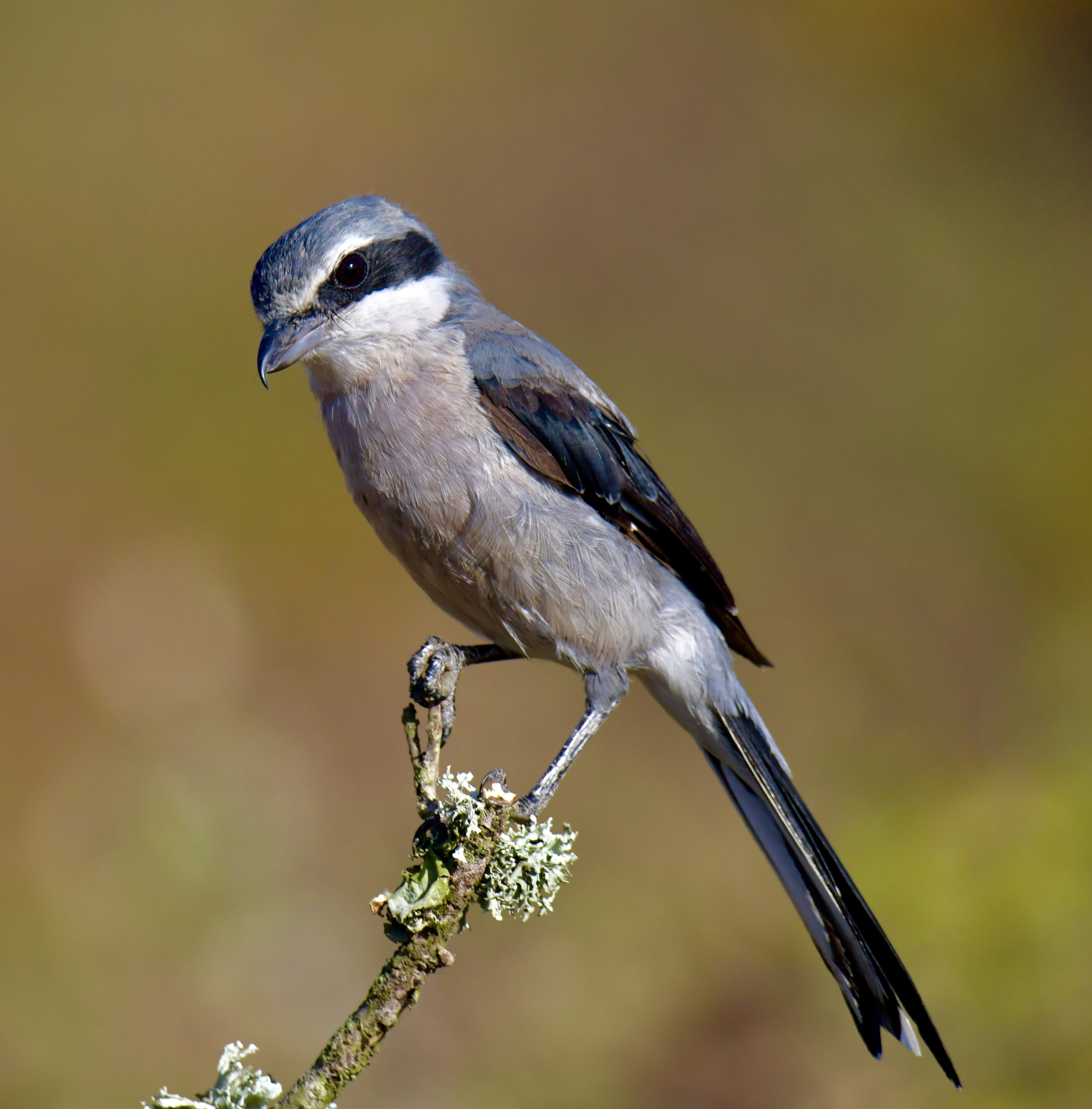
- in Setúbal, Portugal

Conservation status
- Vulnerable (IUCN 3.1)

Scientific classification
- Kingdom: Animalia
- Phylum: Chordata
- Class: Aves
- Order: Passeriformes
- Family: Laniidae
- Genus: Lanius
- Species: L. meridionalis

Binomial name
- Lanius meridionalis Temminck, 1820
- Range of L. meridionalis

= Iberian grey shrike =

Species of bird

The Iberian grey shrike (Lanius meridionalis) is a species of shrike endemic to southwestern Europe. It is closely related to the great grey shrike, Lanius excubitor, and its plumage is generally similar to it apart from the differences noted below. The Iberian was previously considered conspecific with the great grey; where they co-occur, they do not interbreed and are separated by choice of habitat.

== Taxonomy and systematics ==
The genus name, Lanius, is derived from the Latin word for "butcher", and some shrikes are also known as "butcher birds" because of their feeding habits. The specific meridionalis is Latin for "southern". The common English name "shrike" is from Old English scríc, "shriek", referring to the shrill call. This taxon was included in the great grey shrike (L. excubitor) sensu lato, then it was placed in a taxon called Southern grey shrike with the North African and Western Asian subspecies of L. excubitor. However, phylogenetic studies have shown that the Iberian grey shrike is more closely related to the northern shrike (L. borealis) of North America and Eastern Siberia and was classified as a separate species while the systematics of the remaining great grey shrike taxa still need to be resolved.

== Description ==
The Iberian grey shrike is similar in size to the great grey shrikes found in northern Europe but is may have a slightly larger head, stronger bill and thinner tail. The plumage of the Iberian grey shrike is much darker grey above, especially on the crown, nape and mantle and there is a greyish-pink hue to the breast and belly. The black mask is wider and there is a clearer white supercilium. There is a moderately large white patch on the primaries but no white on the secondaries. Juveniles are less distinctive.

== Distribution and habitat ==
The Iberian grey shrike is endemic to southwestern Europe where it occurs across most of the Iberian Peninsula, extending into southern France. It breeds in open habitats, such as open, dry plains, typically on limestone heath or stony grassland with some scrub and single trees and bushes trees and bushes.

== Behaviour and ecology ==
This medium-sized passerine bird eats large insects, small birds and rodents. Like other shrikes it hunts from prominent perches, and impales corpses on thorns or barbed wire as a "larder".

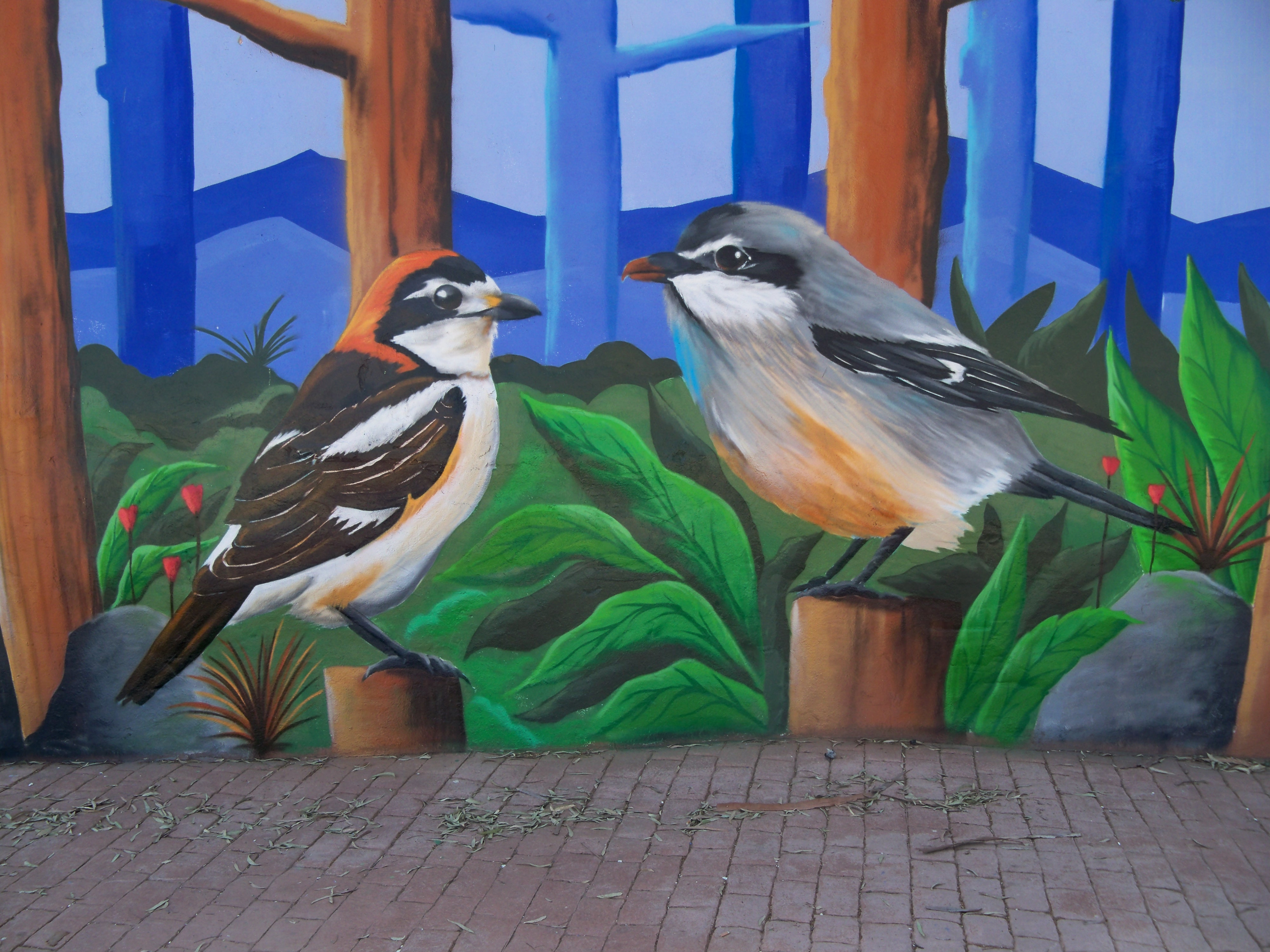
A street mural in Málaga featuring a woodchat shrike (L. senator, left) and Iberian grey shrike (right)

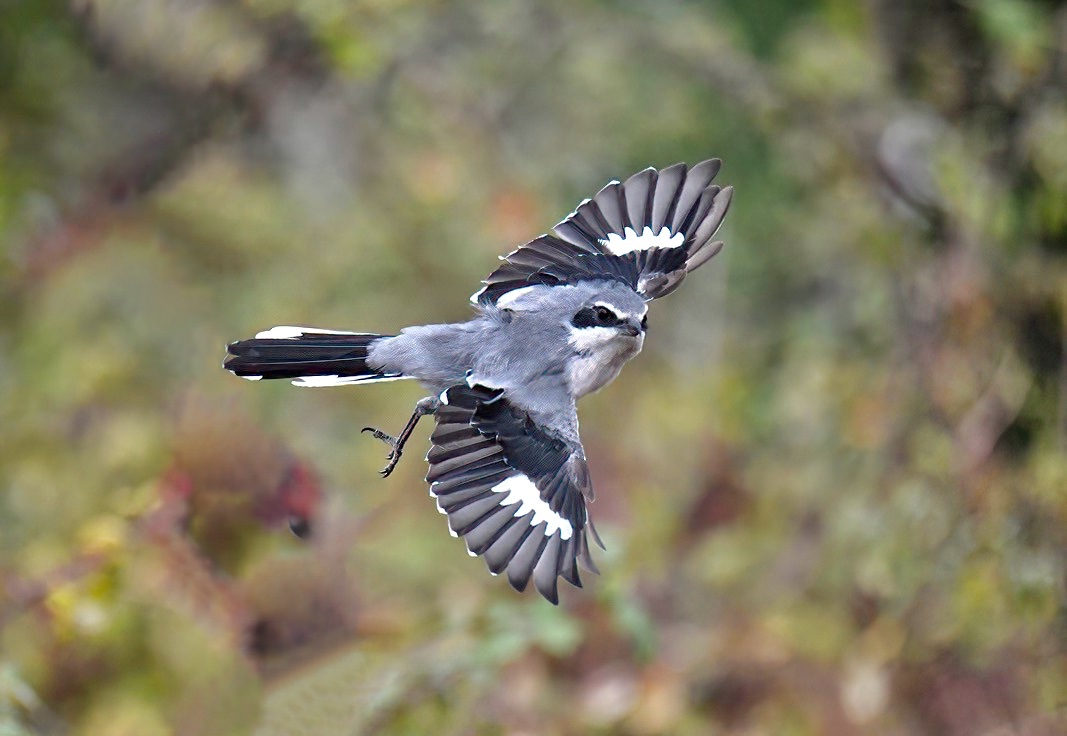
In flight

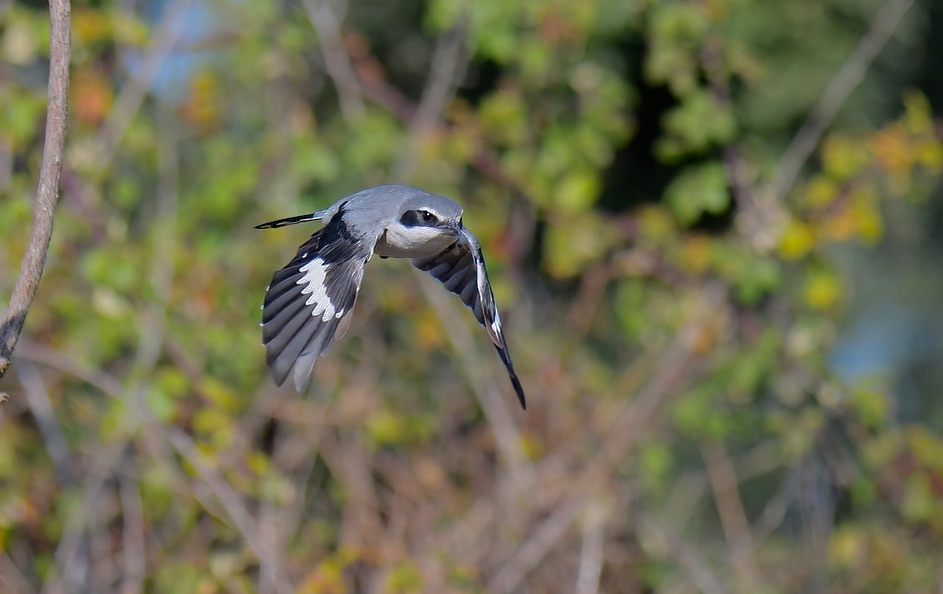
In flight

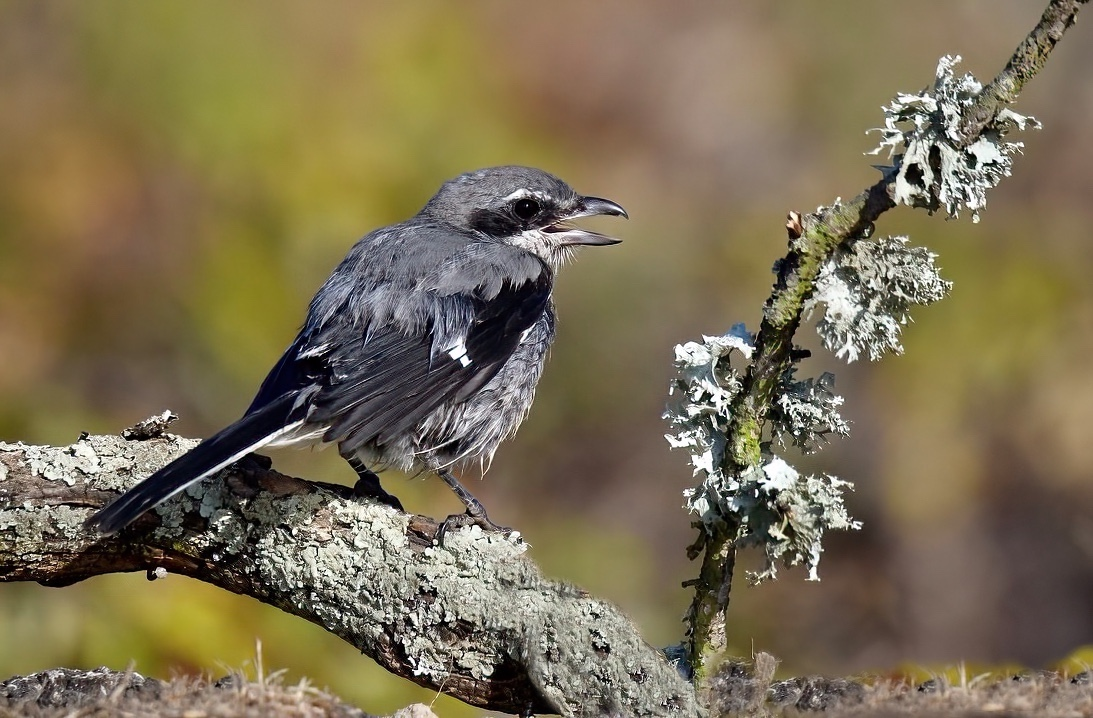
Juvenile

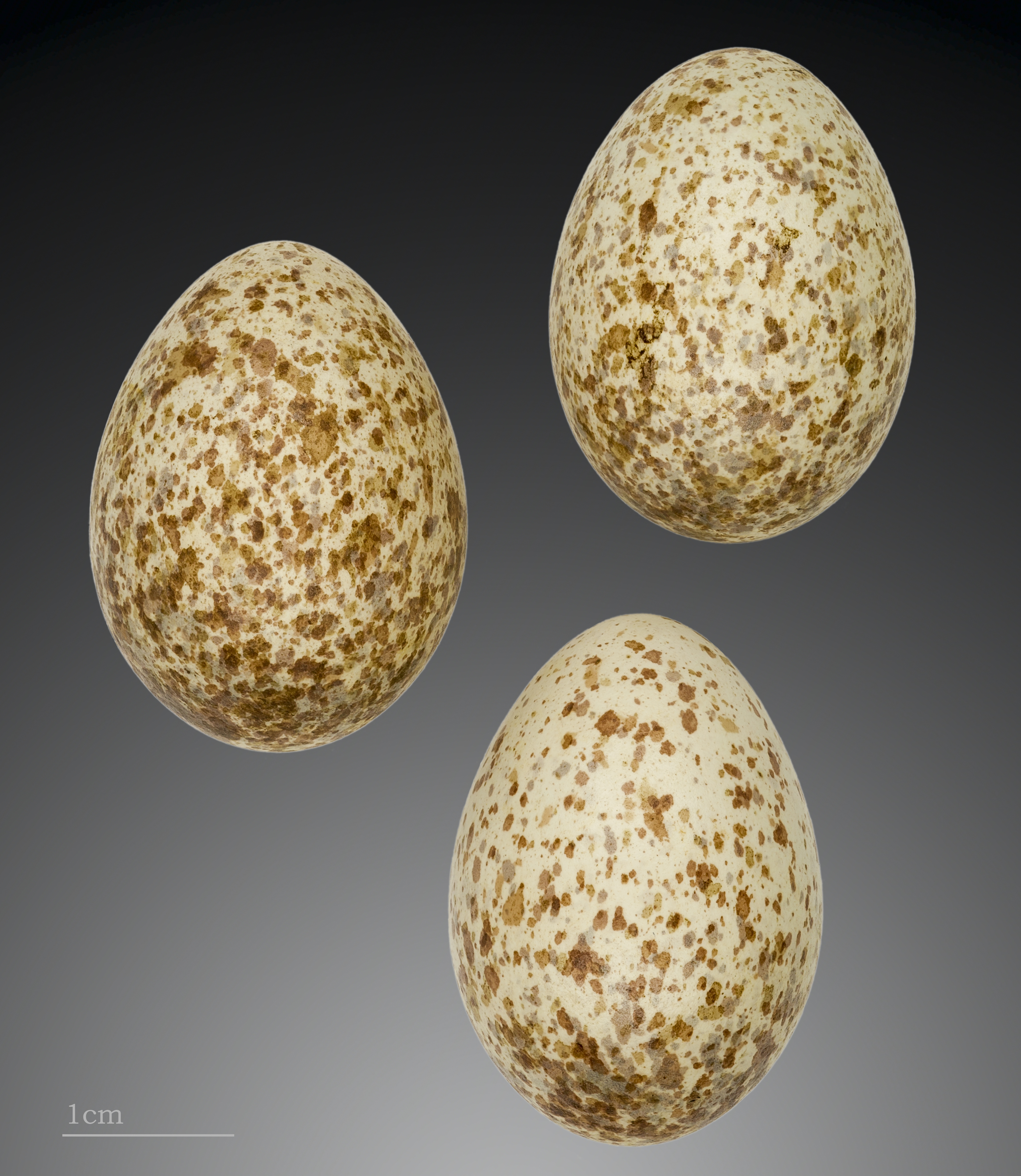
Eggs of Lanius meridionalis - MHNT

== Bibliography ==
=== Identification ===
- Jorma Tenovuo & Juha Varrela (1998) Identification of the Great Grey Shrike complex in Europe Alula 4(1): 4 - 11
- Clement, Peter, and Tim Worfolk (1995) Southern and eastern Great Grey Shrikes in northwest Europe Birding World 8(8) 300-309
