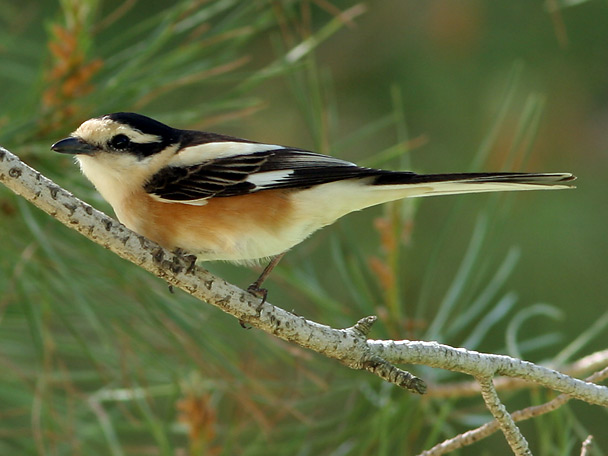
- Male

Conservation status
- Least Concern (IUCN 3.1)

Scientific classification
- Kingdom: Animalia
- Phylum: Chordata
- Class: Aves
- Order: Passeriformes
- Family: Laniidae
- Genus: Lanius
- Species: L. nubicus

Binomial name
- Lanius nubicus Lichtenstein, MHC, 1823
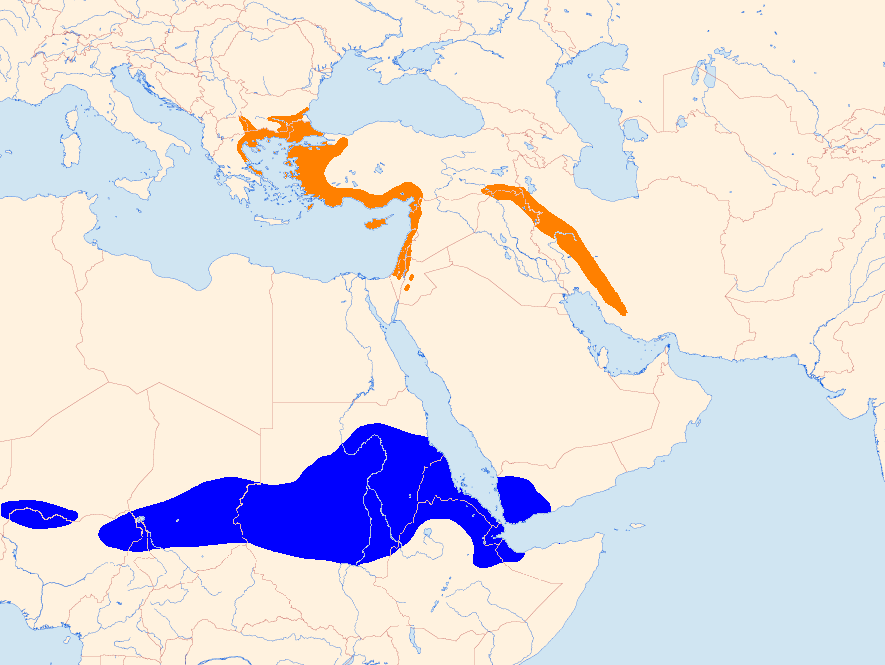
- Summer Winter

= Masked shrike =

Migratory bird in the family Laniidae

The masked shrike (Lanius nubicus) is a species of bird in the shrike family, Laniidae. It breeds in southeastern Europe and at the eastern end of the Mediterranean, with a separate population in eastern Iraq and western Iran. It is migratory, wintering mainly in northeast Africa. Although it is a short-range migrant, vagrants have occurred widely elsewhere, including northern and western Europe. It is the smallest member of its genus, long-tailed and with a hooked bill. The male has mainly black upperparts, with white on its crown, forehead and supercilium and large white patches on the shoulders and wings. The throat, neck sides and underparts are white, with orange flanks and breast. The female is a duller version of the male, with brownish black upperparts and a grey or buff tone to the shoulders and underparts. The juvenile has grey-brown upperparts with a paler forehead and barring from the head to rump, barred off-white underparts and brown wings аpart from the white primary patches. The species' calls are short and grating, but the song has melodic warbler-like components.

The masked shrike's preferred habitat is open woodland with bushes and some large trees. It is less conspicuous than its relatives, avoiding very open country and often perching in less exposed locations. The nest is a neat cup built in a tree by both adults, and the clutch is normally 4–6 eggs, which are incubated by the female for 14–16 days until hatching. The chicks are fed by both parents until they fledge 18–20 days later, and remain dependent on the adults for about 3–4 weeks after leaving the nest. The masked shrike eats mainly large insects, occasionally small vertebrates; it sometimes impales its prey on thorns or barbed wire. Populations are decreasing in parts of the European range, but not rapidly enough to raise serious conservation concerns, and the species is therefore classified by the International Union for Conservation of Nature as being of least concern.

== Taxonomy ==
The shrikes are a family of slender, long-tailed passerines, most of its members being in the genus Lanius, the typical shrikes. They are stocky, short-necked birds with rounded wings and a hooked tip to the bill. Most occur in open habitats, and hunt relatively large prey, including amphibians, lizards and small mammals, such as mice. The affiliations of the masked shrike with other members of the genus are uncertain; the "brown" shrikes (brown, red-backed and isabelline shrikes) and tropical species like the Somali fiscal have both been suggested as possible relatives. On the other hand, it has been suggested more recently that the masked shrike could be a basal member of the Laniidae, perhaps more closely related to Corvinella and Urolestes than to Lanius proper. The masked shrike has no subspecies.

The masked shrike was described by German explorer and naturalist Martin Lichtenstein in 1823 under its current scientific name. Lanius is the Latin for a butcher, and comes from the shrikes' habit of impaling prey, reminiscent of a butcher hanging carcasses, and nubicus means "Nubian" (from northeast Africa). The bird was independently described by Dutch zoologist Coenraad Temminck in 1824 as Lanius personatus, from the Latin personatus "masked", referring, as does the English name, to the bird's appearance, but the older name takes precedence. A later synonym from 1844 was L. leucometopon from the Greek leukos, "white", and metopon, "forehead", describing a feature of the distinctive head pattern. "Shrike", first recorded in 1545, derives from the shrill cries given by this family, and the traditional common name "butcher-bird" again refers to the characteristic prey storage, and has been in use since at least 1668.

== Description ==
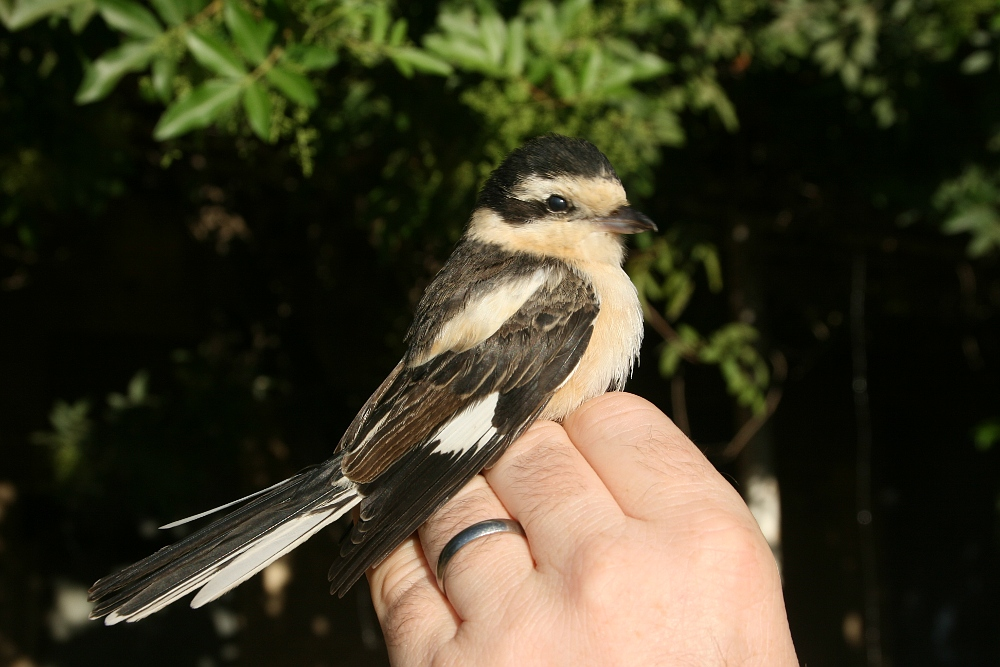
Female in Israel

The masked shrike is the smallest of its genus, a slender bird which usually weighs 20–23 g (0.71–0.81 oz), measuring 17–18.5 cm (6.7–7.3 in) long with a 24–26.5 cm (9.4–10.4 in) wingspan. It has a long tail and relatively small bill, on each side of which is a tomial tooth; the upper mandible bears a triangular ridge which fits a corresponding notch in the lower mandible. This adaptation is otherwise only found in falcons.

The male has mainly black upperparts, a white crown, forehead and supercilium. There are large white patches on the shoulders and primaries, and the outermost tail feathers are also white. The throat, neck sides and underparts are white, with orange on the flanks and breast. The iris is brown, the bill is black and the legs are dark brown or black. The female is a duller version of the male, with brownish-black upperparts and a grey or buff tinge to the white shoulder patches and underparts. The juvenile has grey-brown upperparts with darker bars from the head to rump, a paler grey forehead, barred off-white underparts and brown wings with white primary patches.

Masked shrikes are most similar in appearance to woodchat shrikes, but are smaller, more slender and longer-tailed. Adults of the two species are easily distinguished, since the masked shrike has white on its head and a dark rump, whereas the woodchat shrike has a black crown, rusty nape and white rump. Juveniles are more similar, but the masked shrike has a longer tail, paler face, and grey back and rump, whereas the woodchat shrike has a sandy back and pale grey rump.

Juveniles moult their head, body and some wing feathers a few weeks after fledging, and adults have a complete moult after breeding. In both cases, if the process is not complete by the time of migration it is suspended and completed on the wintering grounds.

=== Voice ===
The masked shrike gives the harsh calls typical of this family, with repeated tsr, tzr or shek notes and some whistles, and when alarmed produces a rattling krrrr. The bill may be snapped when the bird is agitated. The song, up to a minute long, is soft for a shrike, with chattering sounds interspersed with rich warbles. It resembles the songs of Hippolais species, particularly the olive-tree warbler. On rare occasions, males may sing in flight.

In the film the Great Escape, the POWs were taught how to mimic the masked shrike's call.

== Distribution and habitat ==
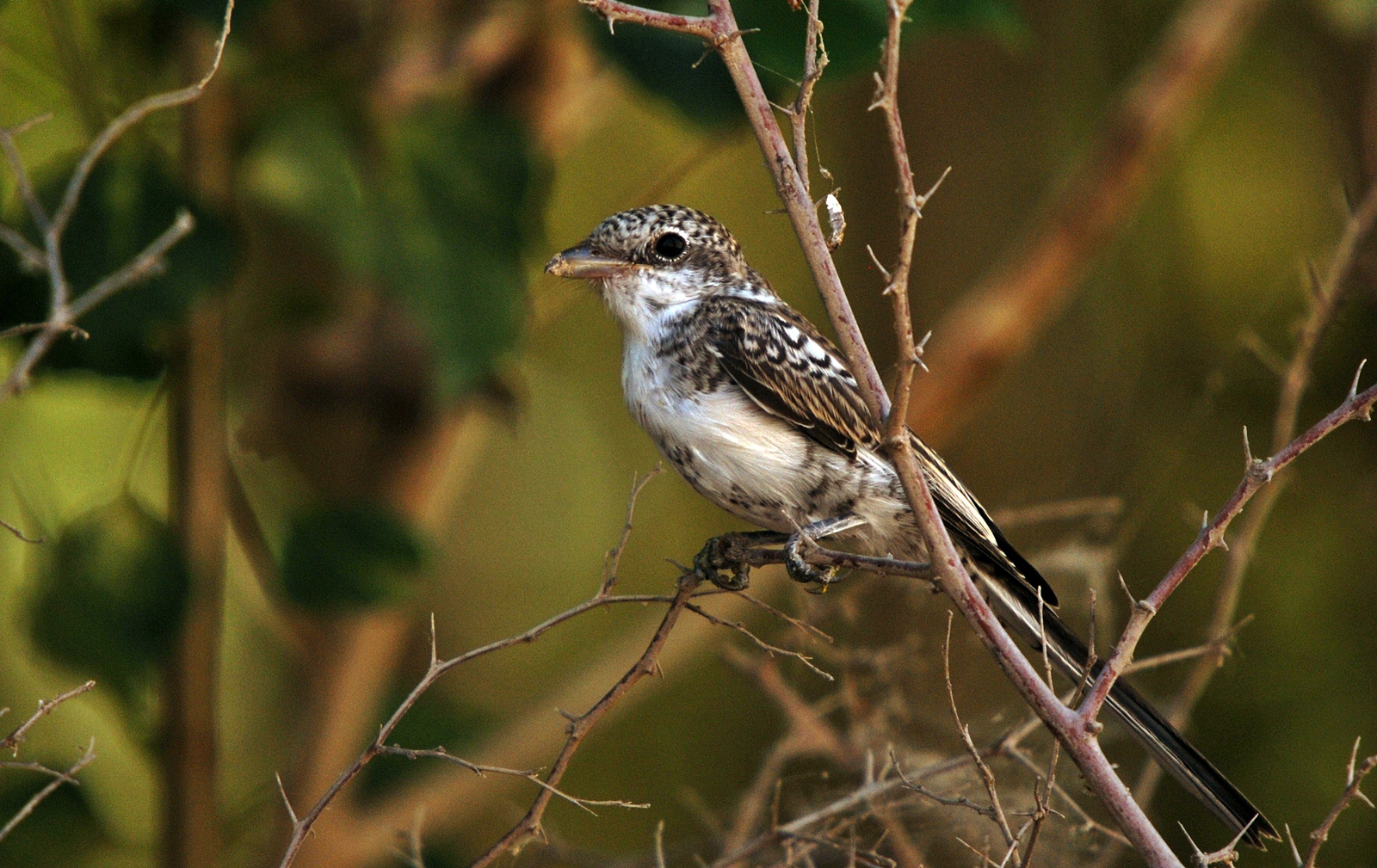
Juvenile

The masked shrike breeds in the Balkans and Western Asia: southern Bulgaria, eastern Republic of North Macedonia, northeast Greece and some of the Greek islands, Turkey, Cyprus and from Syria south to Israel. It also nests in eastern Iraq and western Iran. The range in the east is uncertain, and may include Afghanistan and northern Saudi Arabia. It is migratory, wintering south of the Sahara, mainly in Chad, Sudan and Ethiopia. Smaller numbers are found west to eastern Mali and Nigeria, and in northern Kenya and southern Saudi Arabia. Most birds leave the breeding areas in late August and September, and return north in February and March.

This species is seen in Egypt, Jordan and Israel much more often in spring than autumn, suggesting that the southern movement may be concentrated further east. Birds will hold small territories on about 0.5 hectares (1.2 acres) on migration, and, unlike other shrikes, may congregate in significant numbers. More than 100 have been seen in one locality in Israel, with five in a single bush. This shrike has occurred as a vagrant in Algeria, Finland, Kenya, Libya, Spain, Sweden, Mauritania and Turkmenistan. At least three individuals have been documented in Great Britain, and three individuals in Armenia.

The masked shrike's preferred habitat is open woodland with bushes and some large trees. Unlike its relatives, it avoids very open, lightly vegetated country. Orchards and other cultivated land with suitable old trees or large hedges are also used by this species. It is normally found in more wooded areas than sympatric shrikes. It occurs in lowlands and in hills up to 1,000 m (3,300 ft). In some areas breeding occurs at greater altitudes, up to 2,000 m (6,600 ft). It may occur in gardens and resorts on migration, and in winter again prefers open country with thorny bushes and large trees like acacia or introduced eucalyptus.

== Behaviour ==
The masked shrike is a solitary species except when on migration. It maintains a breeding territory of 2–5 ha (5–12 acres) and is also territorial on the wintering grounds, defending an area of about 3 ha (7 acres). Although unafraid of humans, it is aggressive to its own species and other birds which infringe on its territory. Most other shrikes use high, exposed branches throughout the year, but the masked shrike only uses conspicuous locations at the start of the breeding season, otherwise choosing lower, more sheltered spots. It perches upright, frequently cocking its tail, and has an easy, agile flight. A masked shrike has been recorded as feigning injury when trapped, only to return to normal when the threat receded.

=== Breeding ===
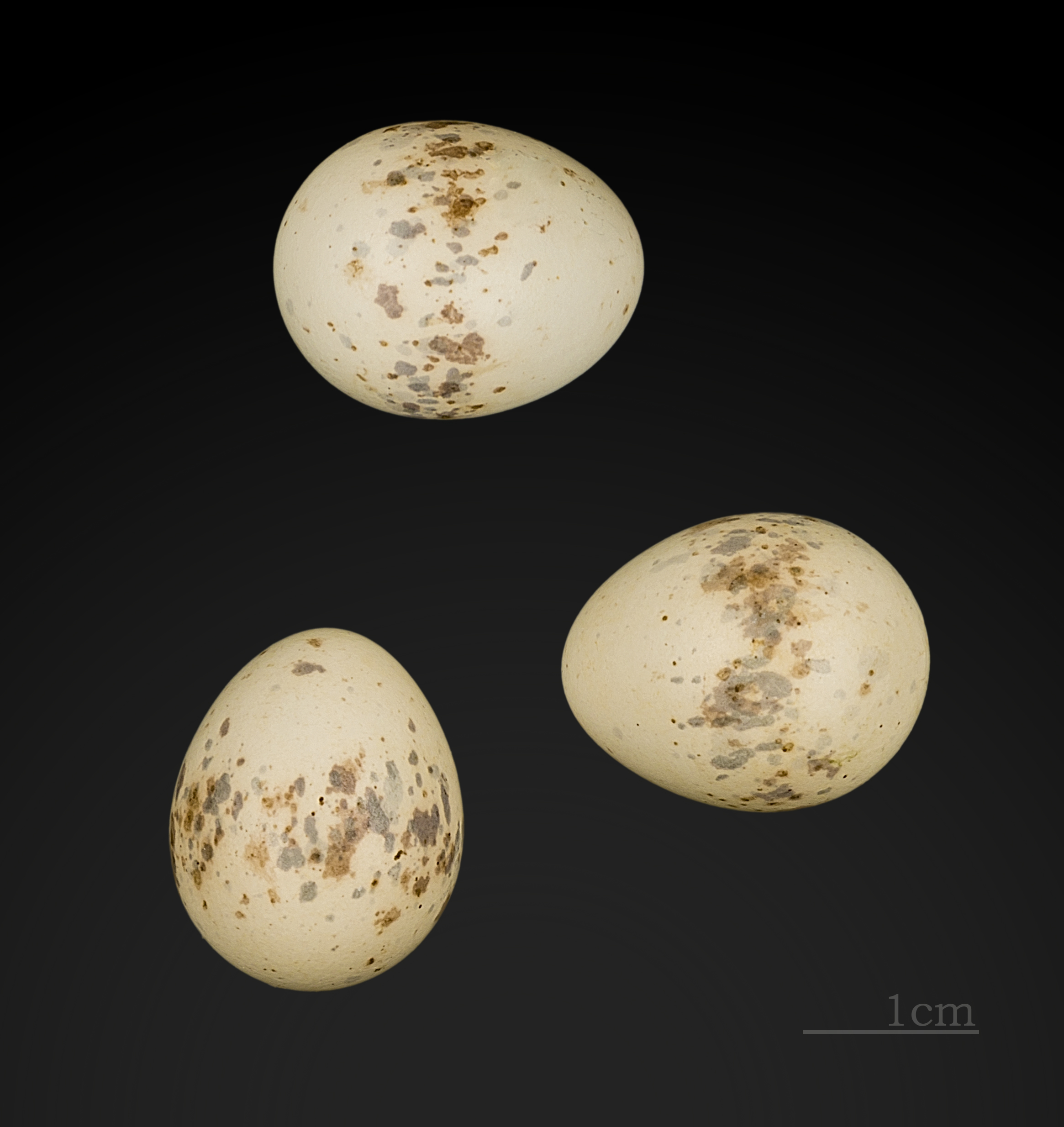
Eggs

Male masked shrikes sing from perches in their territories from early April, sometimes chasing or competing vocally with neighbouring males. The male's courtship display, usually accompanied by singing, starts with the bird perching erect and shivering its wings on an exposed perch, and is followed by the shrike stepping down its branch and bowing, either on the move or while temporarily halted. The male may also give a fluttering, zigzagging flight display. The female is sometimes fed by her mate while she crouches with spread wings and gives begging calls. Elements of the display are shared with other shrikes, but stepping-down and bowing on the move appear to be confined to this species.

The nest, built by both sexes, is a small, neat cup of rootlets, stems and twigs, lined with wool or hair, and adorned with lichen externally. It is constructed in a tree 1.5–10 m (4.9–32.8 ft) above the ground and averages 170 mm (6.7 in) wide and 65 mm (2.6 in) deep, with the cup 75 mm (3.0 in) across and a 35 mm (1.4 in) in depth. Eggs are laid from April to June, mainly in May in the lowlands and about a month later in the mountains. Replacement clutches are laid in June or July if the nest fails, and second broods appear to be common in at least some areas. The first nest is destroyed by the pair to provide material for a replacement breeding attempt. The eggs average 20 mm × 16 mm (0.79 in × 0.63 in) in size and are variable in colour, with a background of grey, cream or yellow, diffuse grey blotches, and a ring of brown markings. The normal clutch is 4–6 eggs, which are incubated by the female for 14–16 days until hatching. The altricial downy chicks are fed by both parents until they fledge 18–20 days later. They are dependent on the adults for about 3–4 weeks after leaving the nest. The masked shrike breeds in its first year, but its average life span is unknown.

Vertebrate predators of young birds include cats and crows. This species may also be infected by parasites, such as a tick, Hyalomma marginatum, and at least two species of Haemoproteus blood parasites.

=== Feeding ===
Like its relatives, the masked shrike hunts from a perch, typically 3–8 m (10–26 ft) high, although usually in less exposed locations than those favoured by most other shrikes. Prey is usually taken from the ground, but occasionally picked off foliage or caught in the air with an agile flycatcher-like flight. The kill may be impaled on thorns or barbed wire as a "larder" for immediate or later consumption. Because passerines have relatively weak legs, impalement holds the corpse while it is dismembered. It was once thought that this behaviour was shown mainly by male shrikes in the breeding season, but this is not the case. Masked shrikes of both sexes are known to impale in winter and on migration. Individual birds may be very tame, following a gardener or feeding close to an observer.

The masked shrike feeds mainly on large insects, although other arthropods and small vertebrates are also caught. Shrikes fatten up before migration, but to a lesser extent than other passerines because they can feed on the way, sometimes taking other tired migrants. Despite its relatively small size, the masked shrike has been recorded as killing species such as lesser whitethroat and little swift. Vertebrates are killed by bill blows to the back of the head, and the tomial teeth are then used to separate the neck bones.

== Status ==
Female (Riyadh, Saudi Arabia 1992)

The International Union for Conservation of Nature (IUCN) estimates the European population of the masked shrike to be between 105,000–300,000 individuals, suggesting a global total of 142,000–600,000 birds. Although the population appears to be declining, the decrease is not rapid enough to trigger the IUCN vulnerability criteria. The large numbers and extensive breeding range of about 353,000 km^{2} (136,000 sq mi), mean that this shrike is classified by the IUCN as being of least concern.

Numbers have declined in recent decades in Europe, although Bulgaria, Greece and Cyprus still have several thousand breeding pairs. Turkey is a stronghold with up to 90,000 pairs. The species is declining in Greece and Turkey because of habitat loss, and a large decrease in Israel is thought to be due to pesticides. In Somalia, this bird is now rare. Migrating birds are shot in the countries around the eastern Mediterranean, despite legal protection in most countries, and there is some persecution of breeding birds in Greece and Syria, where this species is considered to be unlucky. There are indications that this shrike is adapting to plantations instead of natural woodlands, which could help populations in the longer term.

== Cited texts ==
- Harris, Tony; Franklin, Kim (2000). Shrikes and Bush-shrikes. Princeton University Press. ISBN 0-691-07036-9.
- Jobling, James A (2010). The Helm Dictionary of Scientific Bird Names. London: Christopher Helm. ISBN 978-1-4081-2501-4.
- Lefranc, Norbert; Worfolk, Tim (1997). Shrikes: A Guide to the Shrikes of the World. New Haven, Connecticut: Yale University Press. ISBN 978-0-300-07336-2.
- Lichtenstein, Martin (1823). Verzeichniss der Doubletten des Zoologischen Museums der Königl. Universität zu Berlin (in German). Berlin: Zoologisches Museum in Berlin.
- Lockwood, William Burley (1984). Oxford Book of British Bird Names. Oxford: Oxford University Press. ISBN 0-19-214155-4.
- Snow, David; Perrins, Christopher M, eds. (1998). The Birds of the Western Palearctic concise edition (2 volumes). Oxford: Oxford University Press. ISBN 978-0-19-854099-1.
