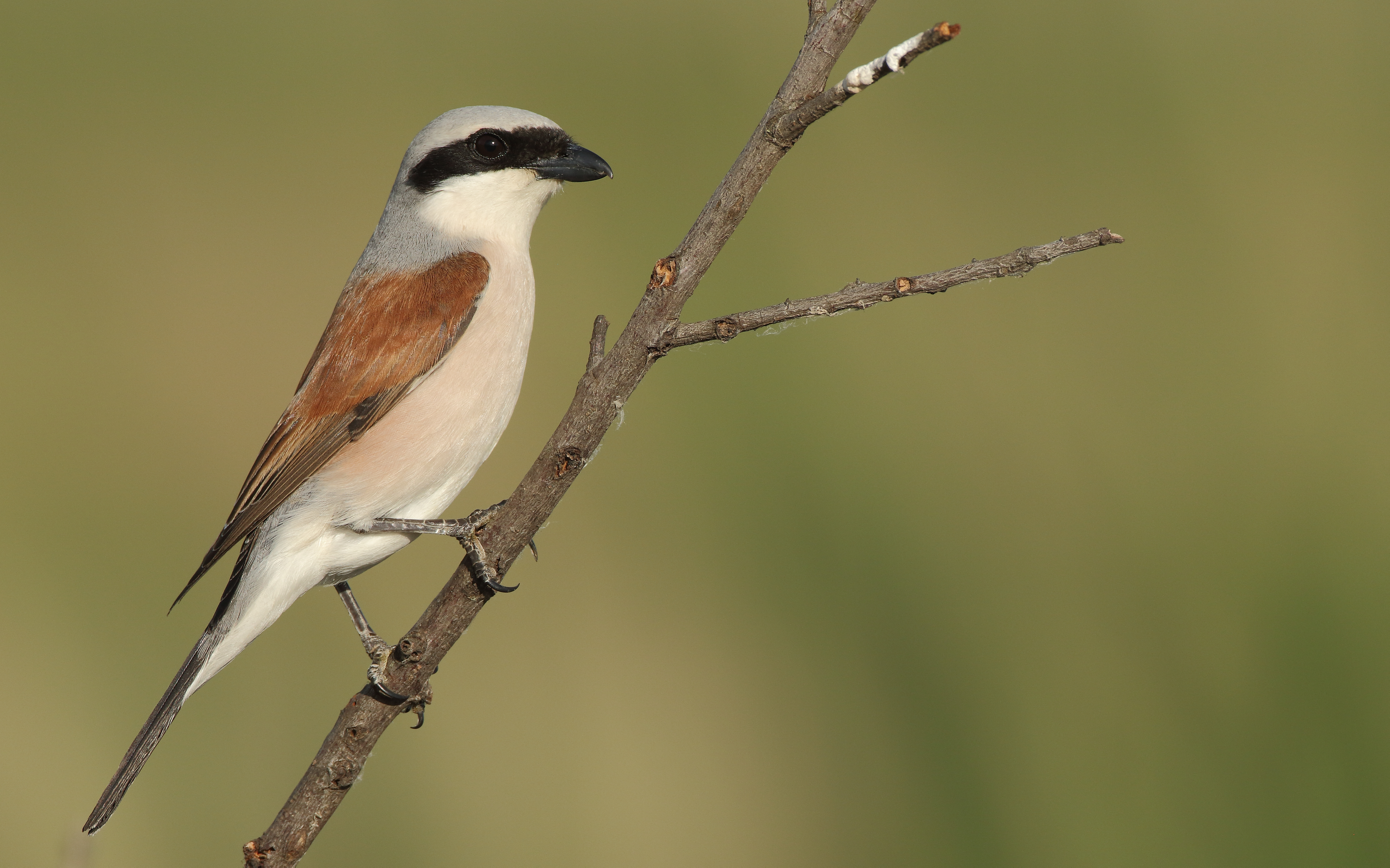
- Red-backed shrike (Lanius collurio)

Scientific classification
- Kingdom: Animalia
- Phylum: Chordata
- Class: Aves
- Order: Passeriformes
- Superfamily: Corvoidea
- Family: Laniidae; Rafinesque, 1815

Genera
- Lanius; Eurocephalus; Corvinella; Urolestes

= Shrike =

Shrikes

Family of birds

Shrikes (/ʃraɪk/) are passerine birds of the family Laniidae. The family is composed of 34 species in four genera.

The family name, and that of the larger genus, Lanius, is derived from the Latin word for "butcher", and some shrikes are also known as butcherbirds because of the habit, particularly of males, of impaling prey onto plant spines within their territories. These larders have multiple functions, attracting females and serving as food stores.

The common English name shrike is from Old English scrīc, alluding to the shrike's shriek-like call.

== Taxonomy ==
The family Laniidae was introduced (as the subfamily Lanidia) in 1815 by the French polymath Constantine Samuel Rafinesque. The type genus Lanius had been introduced by Carl Linnaeus in 1758. As currently constituted, the family contains 34 species in four genera. It includes the genus Eurocephalus with the two white-crowned shrikes. A molecular phylogenetic study published in 2023 found that the white-crowned shrikes were more closely related to the crows in the family Corvidae than they are to the Laniidae and authors proposed that the genus Eurocephalus should be moved to its own family Eurocephalidae. The cladogram below is based on these results:

- - - Platylophidae
      Platylophus – crested jayshrike
    - Laniidae
      Corvinella, Lanius, Urolestes – shrikes and fiscals; 3 genera (32 species)
  - - (Eurocephalidae)
      Eurocephalus – white-crowned shrikes (2 species)
    - Corvidae
      24 genera (135 species)

== Distribution, migration, and habitat ==
Most shrike species have a Eurasian and African distribution, with just two breeding in North America (the loggerhead and northern shrikes). No members of this family occur in South America or Australia, although one species reaches New Guinea. They are unrelated to the Australian butcherbird.

The shrikes vary in the extent of their ranges; some species, such as the great grey shrike, ranging across much of Europe, north Africa, and west and central Asia, while the São Tomé fiscal (or Newton's fiscal) is restricted to the island of São Tomé.

They inhabit open habitats, especially steppe and savannah. A few species of shrikes are forest dwellers, seldom occurring in open habitats. Some species breed in northern latitudes during the summer, then migrate to warmer climes for the winter.

== Description ==
Shrikes are medium-sized birds with grey, brown, or black-and-white plumage. Most species are between 16 and 30 cm (6.3 and 11.8 in) in size; however, the magpie shrike Urolestes melanoleucus, with its extremely elongated tail-feathers, may reach up to 50 cm (20 in) in length, and the smallest, Emin's shrike Lanius gubernator is only 14–16 cm (5.5–6.3 in) long. Their beaks are hooked, like those of a bird of prey, reflecting their carnivorous nature; their calls are strident.

== Behaviour ==
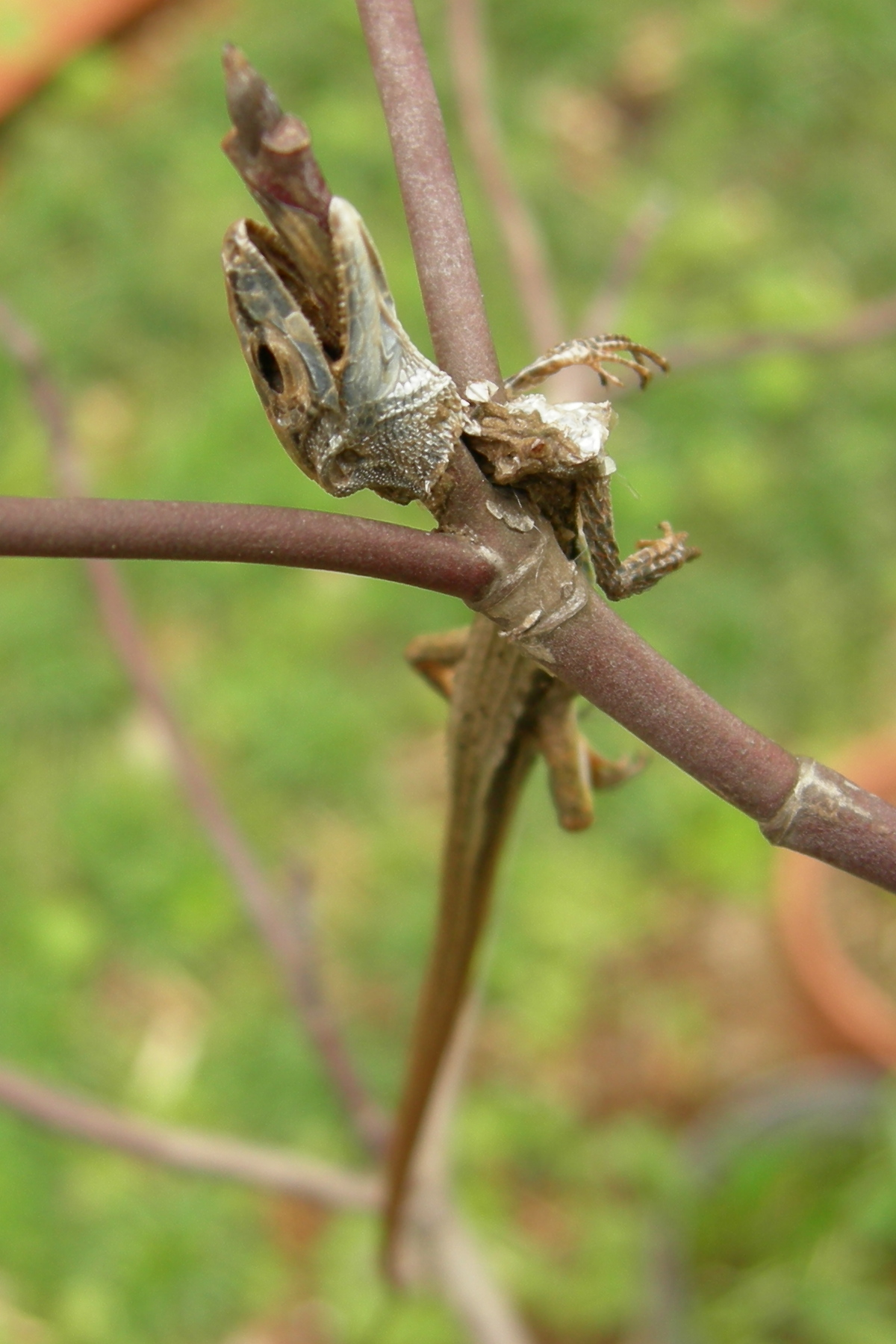
A lizard impaled on a thorn by a shrike for later consumption.

Male shrikes are known for their habit of catching insects and small vertebrates and impaling them on thorns, branches, the spikes on barbed-wire fences, or any available sharp point. These stores serve as a cache so that the shrike can return to the uneaten portions at a later time. The primary function of conspicuously impaling prey on thorny vegetation is however thought to be for males to display their fitness and the quality of the territory held to prospective mates. The impaling behaviour increases during the onset of the breeding season. Female shrikes have been known to impale prey, but primarily to assist in dismembering it. This behaviour may also serve secondarily as an adaptation to eating the toxic lubber grasshopper Romalea microptera. The bird waits 1–2 days for the toxins within the grasshopper to degrade before eating it.

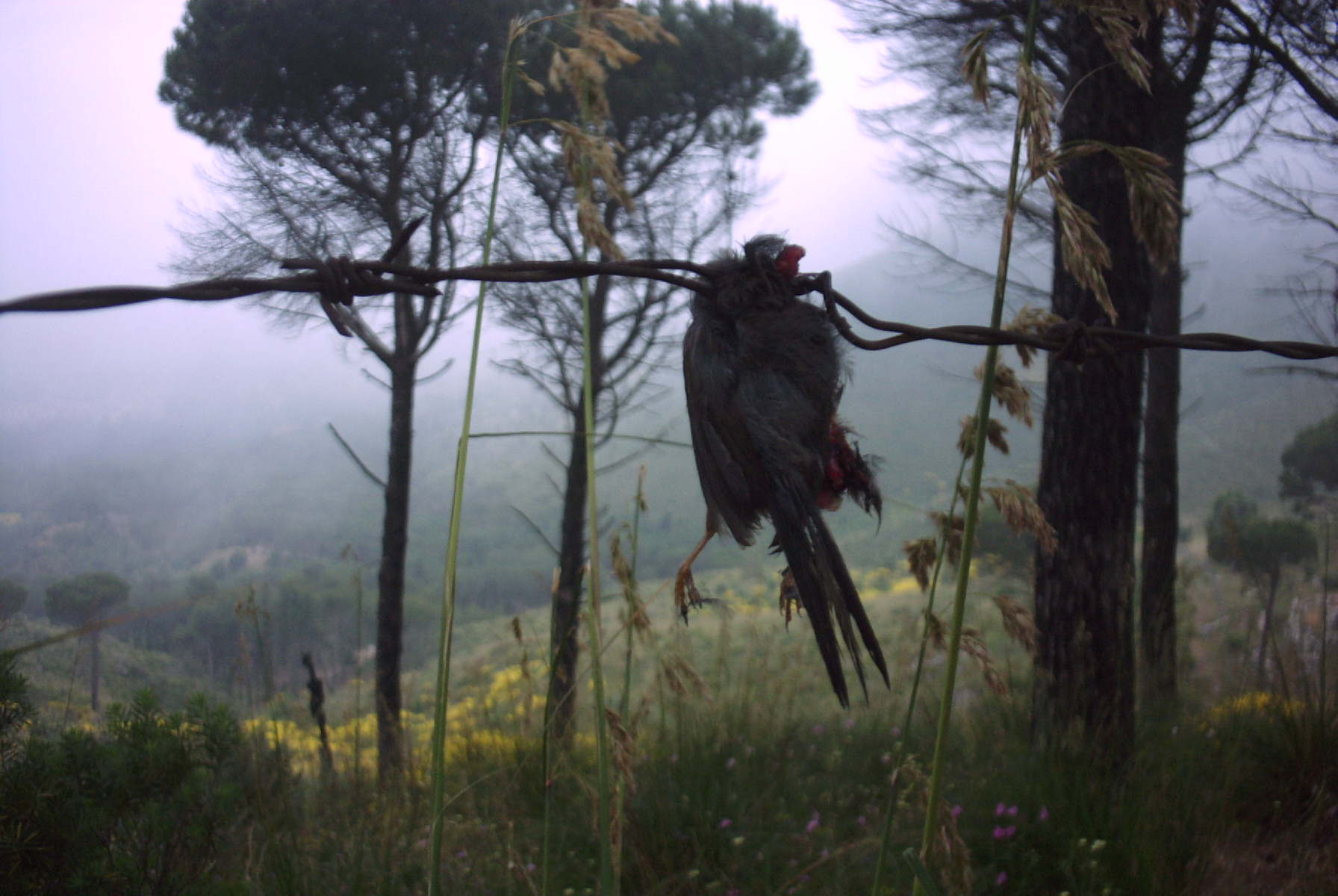
A Sardinian warbler impaled by a shrike in Italy; shrikes sometimes use man-made spikes, such as barbed wire, in place of thorns.

Loggerhead shrikes kill vertebrates by using their beaks to grab or pierce the neck and violently shake their prey.

Shrikes are territorial, and these territories are defended from other pairs. In migratory species, a breeding territory is defended in the breeding grounds and a smaller feeding territory is established during migration and in the wintering grounds. Where several species of shrikes exist together, competition for territories can be intense.

Shrikes make regular use of exposed perch sites, where they adopt a conspicuous 'lookout' stance. These sites are used to watch for prey and to advertise their presence to rivals.

Shrikes vocally imitate their prey to lure them for capture. In 1575, this was noted by the English poet George Turberville:

She will stand at perch upon some tree or poste, and there make an exceedingly lamentable crye ... All to make other fowles to thinke that she is very much distressed ... whereupon the credulous sellie birds do flocke together at her call. If any happen to approach near her, she ... seazeth on them, and devoureth them (ungrateful subtill fowle).

=== Breeding ===
Shrikes are generally monogamous breeders, although polygyny has been recorded in some species. Co-operative breeding, where younger birds help their parents raise the next generation of young, has been recorded in both species in the genera Eurocephalus and Corvinella, as well as one species of Lanius. Males attract females to their territory with well-stocked caches, which may include inedible but brightly coloured items. During courtship, the male performs a ritualised dance which includes actions that mimic the skewering of prey on thorns, and feeds the female. Shrikes make simple, cup-shaped nests from twigs and grasses, in bushes and the lower branches of trees.

== Species in taxonomic order ==
Family: Laniidae

Image	Genus	Living species
	Eurocephalus A. Smith, 1836	Northern white-crowned shrike, Eurocephalus ruppelli Bonaparte, 1853; Southern white-crowned shrike, Eurocephalus anguitimens Smith, A, 1836
	Corvinella Lesson, RP, 1831	Yellow-billed shrike, Corvinella corvina as Lanius corvinus, Shaw, 1809
	Urolestes Cabanis, 1851	Magpie shrike, Urolestes melanoleucus as Lanius melanoleucus, Jardine, 1831
	Lanius Linnaeus, 1758	Long-tailed fiscal, Lanius cabanisi Hartert, EJO, 1906; Grey-backed fiscal, Lanius excubitoroides Prévost & Des Murs, 1847; Taita fiscal, Lanius dorsalis Cabanis, 1878; Great grey shrike, Lanius excubitor Linnaeus, 1758; Steppe grey shrike, Lanius excubitor pallidirostris Cassin, 1851; Somali fiscal, Lanius somalicus Hartlaub & Heuglin, 1859; Loggerhead shrike, Lanius ludovicianus Linnaeus, 1766; Giant grey shrike, Lanius giganteus Przevalski, 1887; Chinese grey shrike, Lanius sphenocercus Cabanis, 1873; Iberian grey shrike, Lanius meridionalis Temminck, 1820; Northern shrike, Lanius borealis Vieillot, 1808; Masked shrike, Lanius nubicus Lichtenstein, MHC, 1823; São Tomé fiscal, Lanius newtoni Barboza du Bocage, 1891; Northern fiscal, Lanius humeralis Stanley, 1814; Emin's shrike, Lanius gubernator Hartlaub, 1882; Mackinnon's shrike, Lanius mackinnoni Sharpe, 1891; Souza's shrike, Lanius souzae Barboza du Bocage, 1878; Southern fiscal, Lanius collaris Linnaeus, 1766; Uhehe fiscal, Lanius collaris marwitzi; Lesser grey shrike, Lanius minor Gmelin, JF, 1788; Woodchat shrike, Lanius senator Linnaeus, 1758; Burmese shrike, Lanius collurioides Lesson, RP, 1831; Tiger shrike, Lanius tigrinus Drapiez, 1828; Bay-backed shrike, Lanius vittatus Valenciennes, 1826; Isabelline shrike, Lanius isabellinus Hemprich & Ehrenberg, 1833; Red-backed shrike, Lanius collurio Linnaeus, 1758; Red-tailed shrike, Lanius phoenicuroides (Schalow, 1875); Mountain shrike or grey-capped shrike, Lanius validirostris Ogilvie-Grant, 1894; Brown shrike, Lanius cristatus Linnaeus, 1758; Bull-headed shrike, Lanius bucephalus Temminck & Schlegel, 1845; Long-tailed shrike, Lanius schach Linnaeus, 1758; Grey-backed shrike, Lanius tephronotus (Vigors, 1831)

== In popular culture ==
The science-fiction novel series Hyperion Cantos by Dan Simmons features a creature called the Shrike, which impales its human victims on the thorns protruding from its body, as well as on a large metal tree where it displays its prey.

A serial killer who snaps the necks of his victims is known as The Shrike in Michael Connelly's Fair Warning.

There is a song called "Shrike" by the Irish musician Hozier, and its lyrics are a direct reference to the bird's habit of impaling its prey on thorns.
