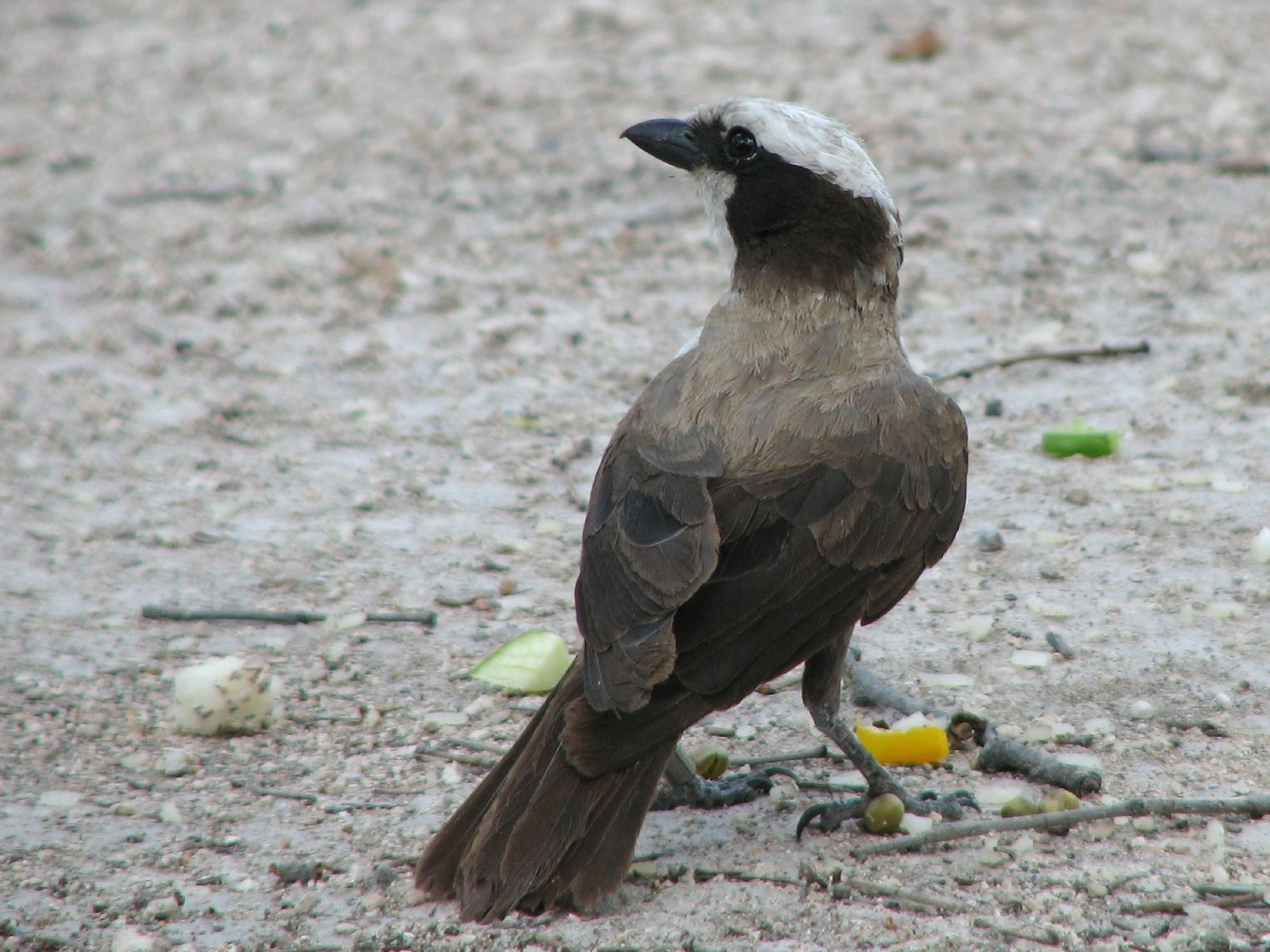
- Southern white-crowned shrike (Eurocephalus anguitimens)

Scientific classification
- Kingdom: Animalia
- Phylum: Chordata
- Class: Aves
- Order: Passeriformes
- Family: Laniidae
- Genus: Eurocephalus; A. Smith, 1836

Type species
- Eurocephalus anguitimens A. Smith, 1836

Species
- E. ruppelli E. anguitimens
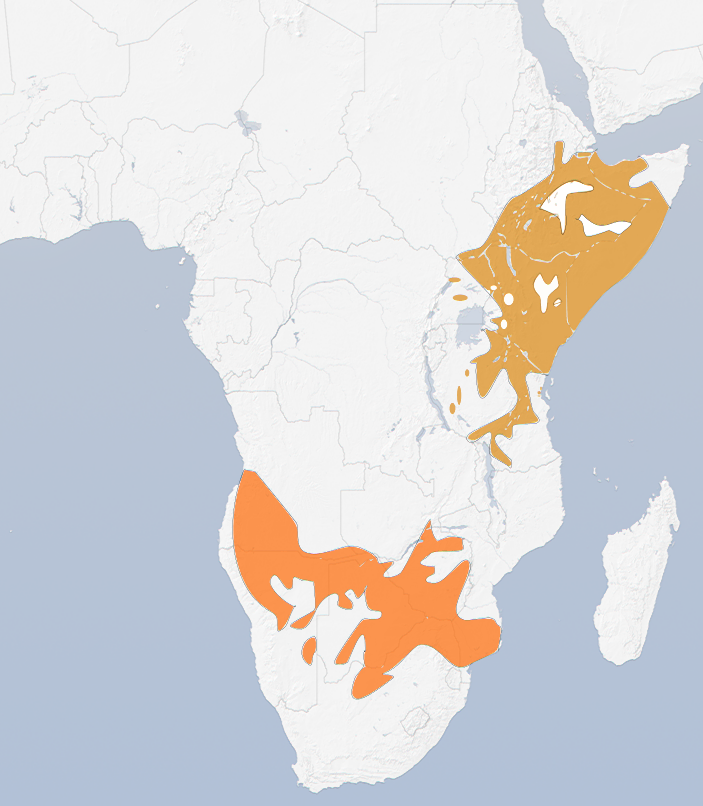

= Eurocephalus =

Genus of birds

Eurocephalus is a small genus of passerine birds containing two species commonly known as white-crowned shrikes.

== Extant Species ==
Image	Scientific name	Common name	Distribution
	Eurocephalus ruppelli	Northern white-crowned shrike or white-rumped shrike	east Africa from south eastern South Sudan and southern Ethiopia to Tanzania
	Eurocephalus anguitimens	Southern white-crowned shrike or white-crowned shrike	Angola, Botswana, Mozambique, Namibia, South Africa, and Zimbabwe.

== Description ==
The white-crowned shrikes are large brown and white shrike-like birds found in sub-Saharan Africa. They are gregarious, unlike the Lanius shrikes, and have a parrot-like flight.

Eurocephalus shrikes are birds of savanna and open woodland habitats, typically seen perched upright on a prominent thornbush perch. These species primarily take large insects, but will occasionally eat fruit which has fallen to the ground.

The male and female are similar in plumage in both species but are distinguishable from immature birds.

== Taxonomy ==
The genus Eurocephalus was introduced in 1836 by the zoologist Andrew Smith to accommodate a single species, the southern white-crowned shrike. He placed the genus in the crow family Corvidae. It was later transferred to the shrike family Laniidae.

A recent analysis of their phylogenetic relationships using molecular markers found them more closely related to the crows than the shrikes and suggested they be placed in a new family, Eurocephalidae. This placement was supported by morphological characteristics, their specialised dietary niche and their cooperative breeding.
