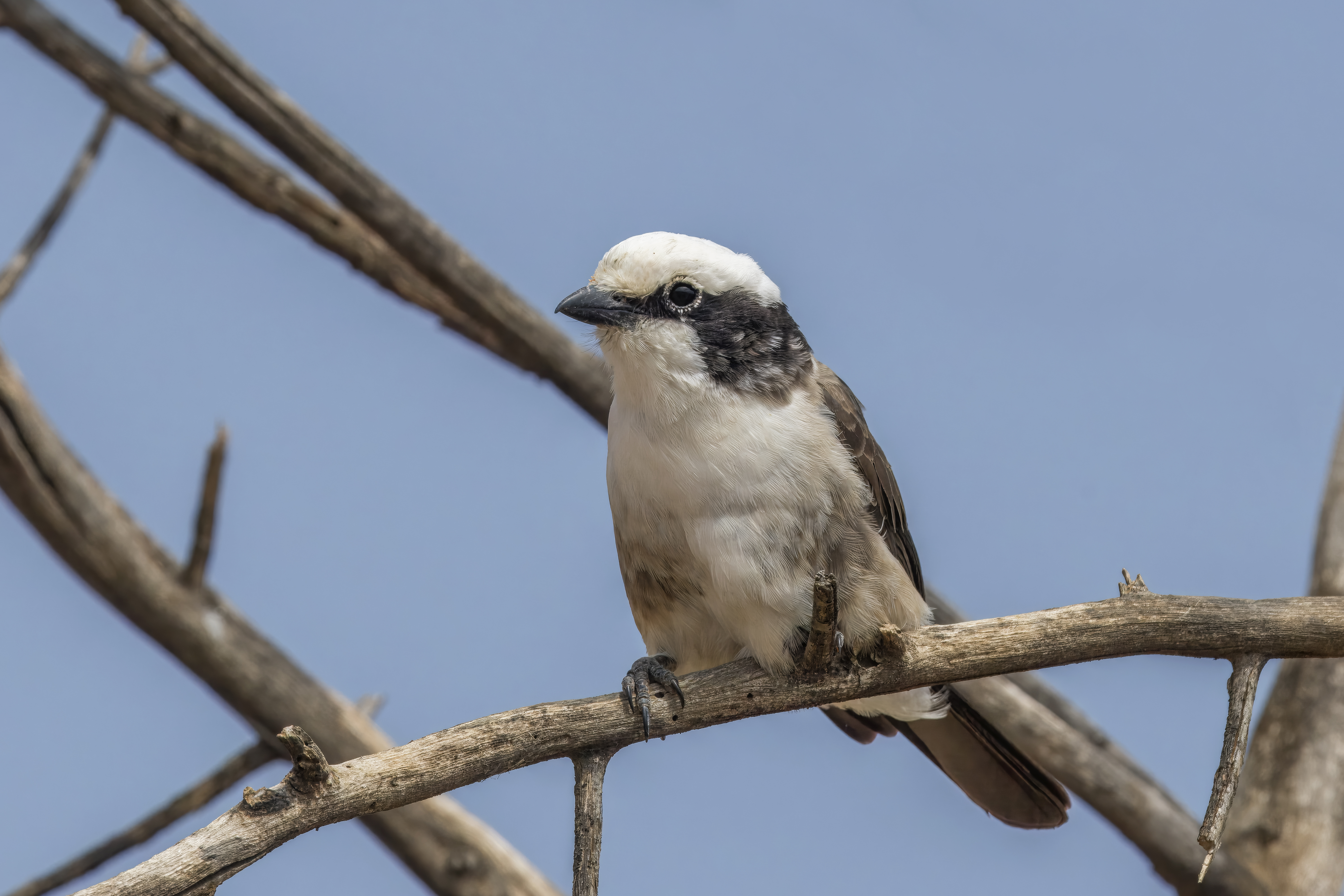
- Serengeti National Park, Tanzania

Conservation status
- Least Concern (IUCN 3.1)

Scientific classification
- Kingdom: Animalia
- Phylum: Chordata
- Class: Aves
- Order: Passeriformes
- Family: Laniidae
- Genus: Eurocephalus
- Species: E. ruppelli

Binomial name
- Eurocephalus ruppelli Bonaparte, 1853
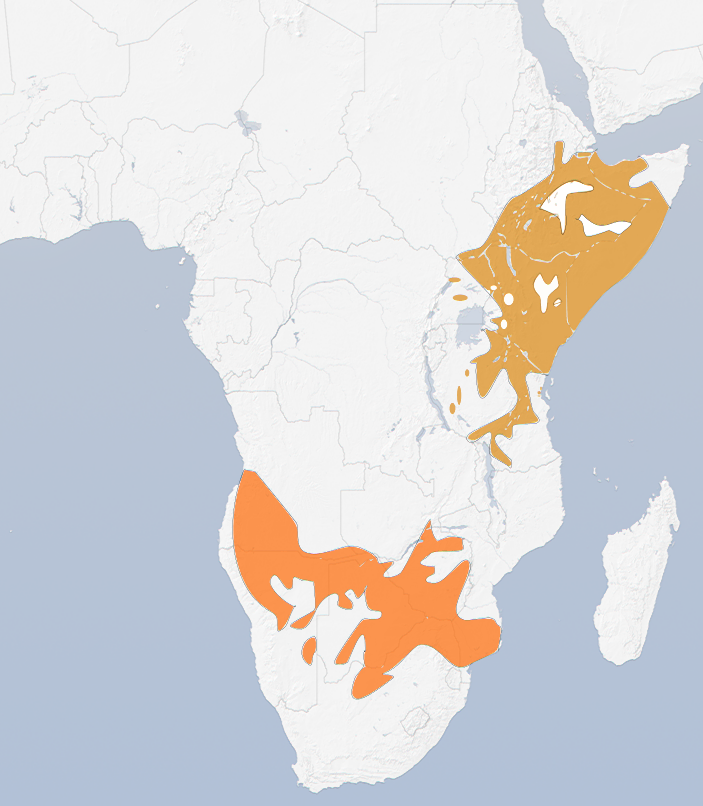
- Range map for the Eurocephalus shrikes E. ruppelli E. anguitimens

Synonyms
- Eurocephalus rueppelli

= Northern white-crowned shrike =

Species of bird

The northern white-crowned shrike or white-rumped shrike (Eurocephalus ruppelli), is a shrike found in dry thornbush, semi-desert, and open acacia woodland in east Africa from south eastern South Sudan and southern Ethiopia to Tanzania. Its binomial name commemorates the German naturalist and explorer Eduard Rüppell.

== Description ==
The northern white-crowned shrike is a large and fluffy passerine, measuring 19–23-cm long and weigh 42–58 gram. The adult has a white crown and rump, black eyestripe, brown back and wings and black tail. The throat, breast and belly are white, and the flanks are brown. The sexes are similar, but juveniles have a brown crown, white head sides, and grey breast. The flight is parrot-like.

Several subspecies have been described, but there is extensive individual variation in plumage. Although birds in the north of the range are larger than in the south, the difference is clinal and the northern white-crowned shrike may be monotypic.

The calls are high-pitched squawks, squeaks and chatters, including kek-kek and chee-chee.

== Behaviour ==
The northern white-crowned shrike is gregarious, occurring in groups of up 12 birds. It hunts from an exposed perch, feeding mainly on large insects, usually taken from the ground. It also will feed from the backs of large mammals, like an oxpecker, and occasionally will eat fruit which has fallen to the ground.

The neat thick-walled cup nest is constructed from grass and spider webs in a horizontal tree fork 4–6 metres above the ground. The two to four white or lilac eggs are blotched with grey, purple or brown. It is likely that cooperative breeding occurs, given the gregarious habits of this species and the known cooperative breeding of the closely related southern white-crowned shrike.

== Status ==
The species has a large distribution range and the population is considered stable. The International Union for Conservation of Nature therefore categorizes it as "Least Concern".
