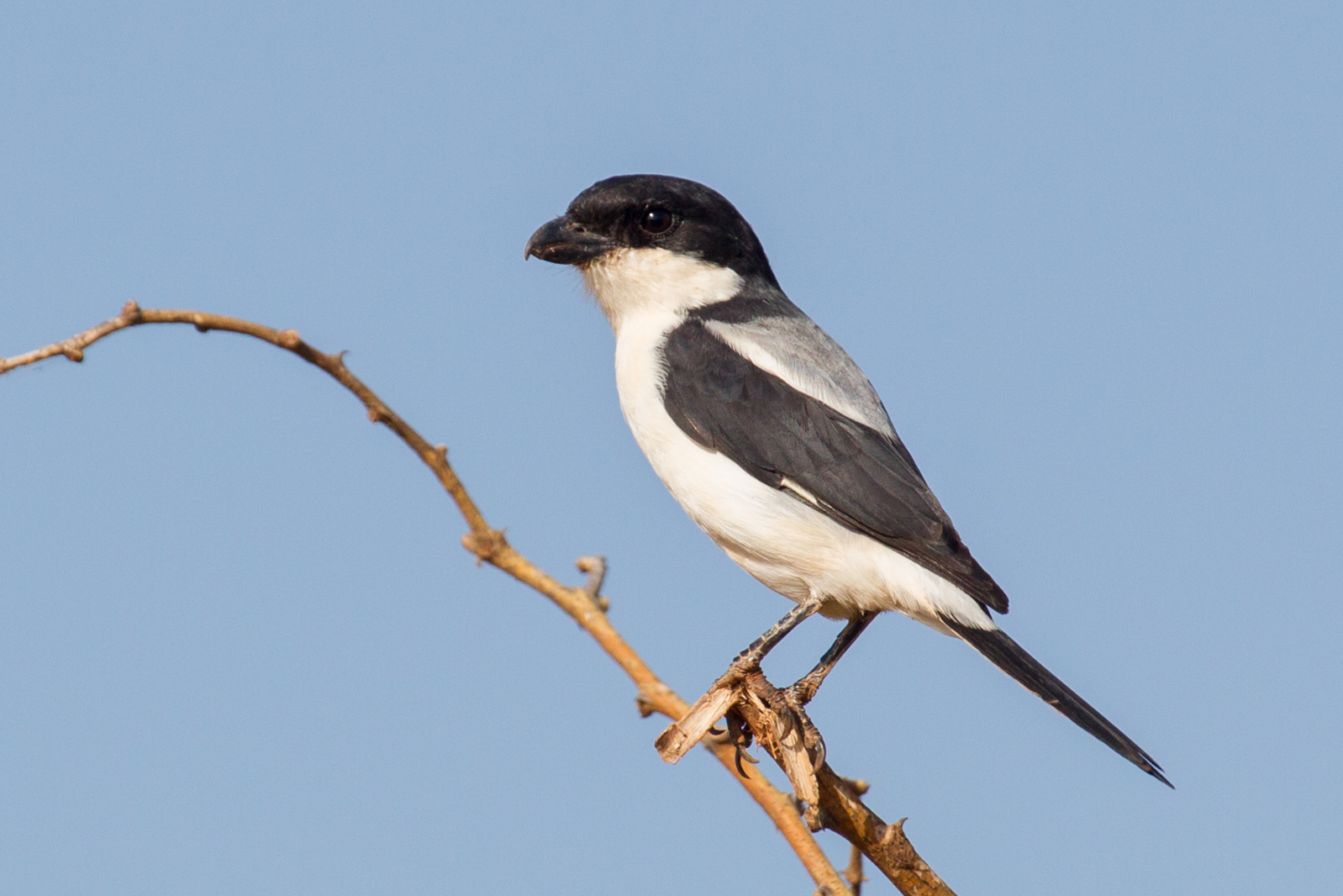
- Adult

Conservation status
- Least Concern (IUCN 3.1)

Scientific classification
- Kingdom: Animalia
- Phylum: Chordata
- Class: Aves
- Order: Passeriformes
- Family: Laniidae
- Genus: Lanius
- Species: L. dorsalis

Binomial name
- Lanius dorsalis Cabanis, 1878

= Taita fiscal =

Species of bird

The Taita fiscal or Teita fiscal (Lanius dorsalis) is a member of the shrike family found in east Africa from southeastern South Sudan, southern Ethiopia, and western Somalia to northeastern Tanzania. Its habitat is dry open thornbush and acacia and other dry open woodland.

== Description ==
This is a fairly distinctive 21 cm (8.3 in)-long passerine with white underparts and a black crown, hindneck and wings. The back is grey with a characteristic white 'V' and the rump is white. The tail is relatively long and black with white outer feathers. There is a small white patch on the wings. The bill, eyes and legs are black. The adult male and female Taita fiscal have similar plumage except for a rufous lower flank of the female which is usually hidden by the wing. The juvenile is mainly brown–black above, with barring on the head and buff tips to the shoulder feathers. Its underparts are whitish with darker barring. The adult Taita fiscal is distinguished from other black-headed fiscals by the grey back and the wing pattern, if those are well seen. It gives a jumbled mix of shrike-like whistles and buzzes, including a chwaa-pikerrek-chrrrr-yook pikechik song.

== Distribution ==
The Taita fiscal has a restricted range in East Africa which overlaps with the range of the Somali fiscal (Lanius somalicus). It is present in most of Kenya, only being absent from the coastal strip and the Highlands. It also occurs in southern and western Somalia, southern Ethiopia, southeastern South Sudan, northeastern Uganda and northern Tanzania.

== Ecology ==
The Taita fiscal is usually solitary and hunts insects and small vertebrates from an exposed perch or the tops of shrubs. The nest is a twig and grass cup built in a thorn tree. Three or four white eggs blotched with grey or white is the typical clutch.
