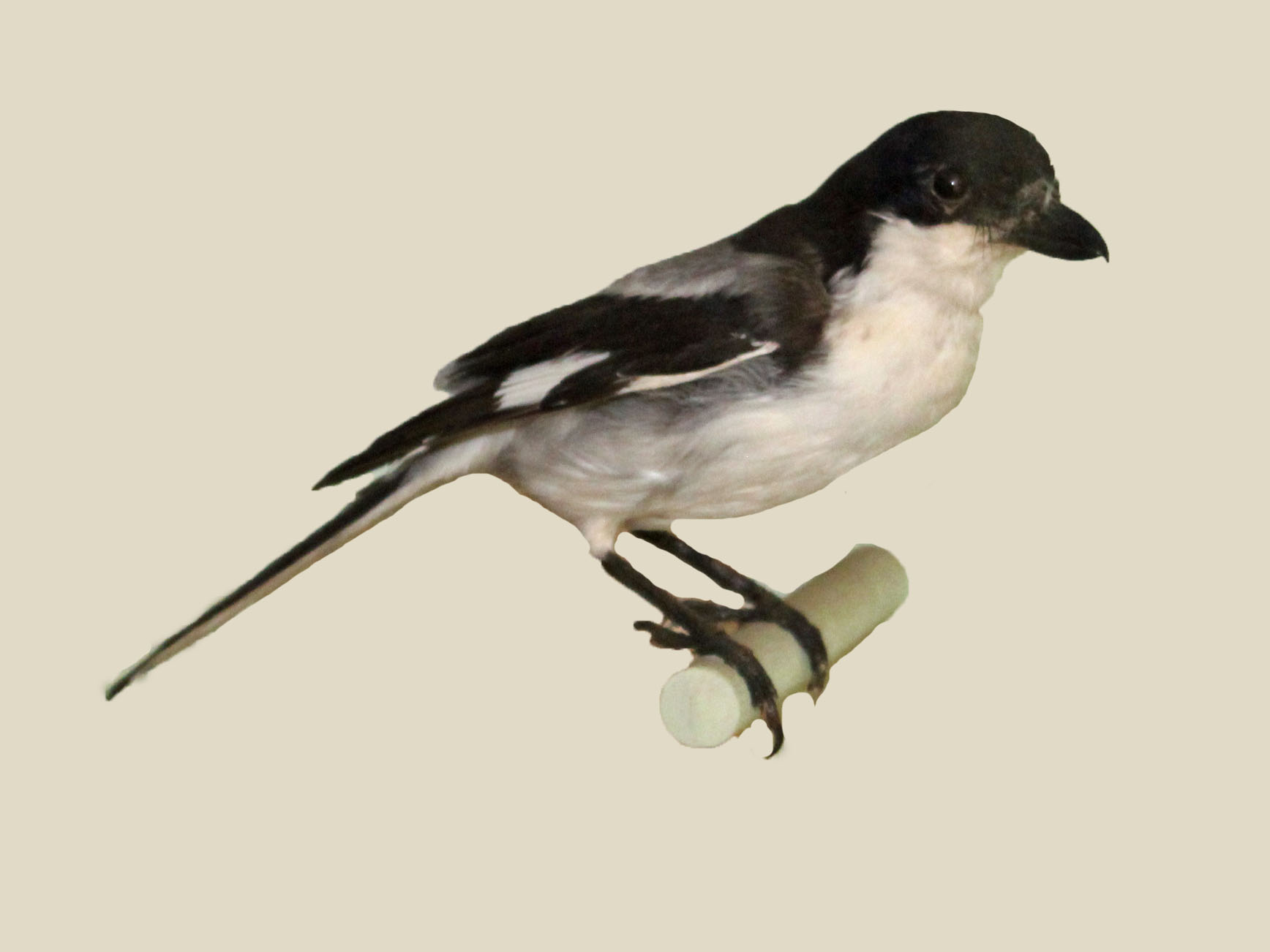
- Specimen at Nairobi National Museum
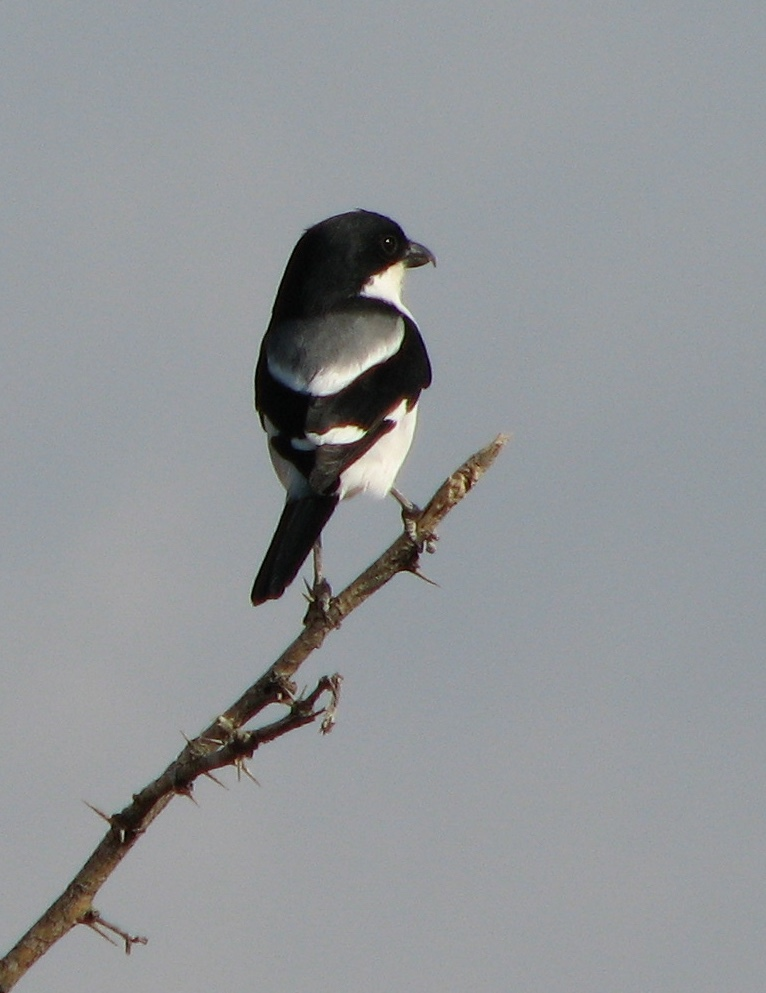

Conservation status
- Least Concern (IUCN 3.1)

Scientific classification
- Kingdom: Animalia
- Phylum: Chordata
- Class: Aves
- Order: Passeriformes
- Family: Laniidae
- Genus: Lanius
- Species: L. somalicus

Binomial name
- Lanius somalicus Hartlaub & Heuglin, 1859

= Somali fiscal =

Species of bird

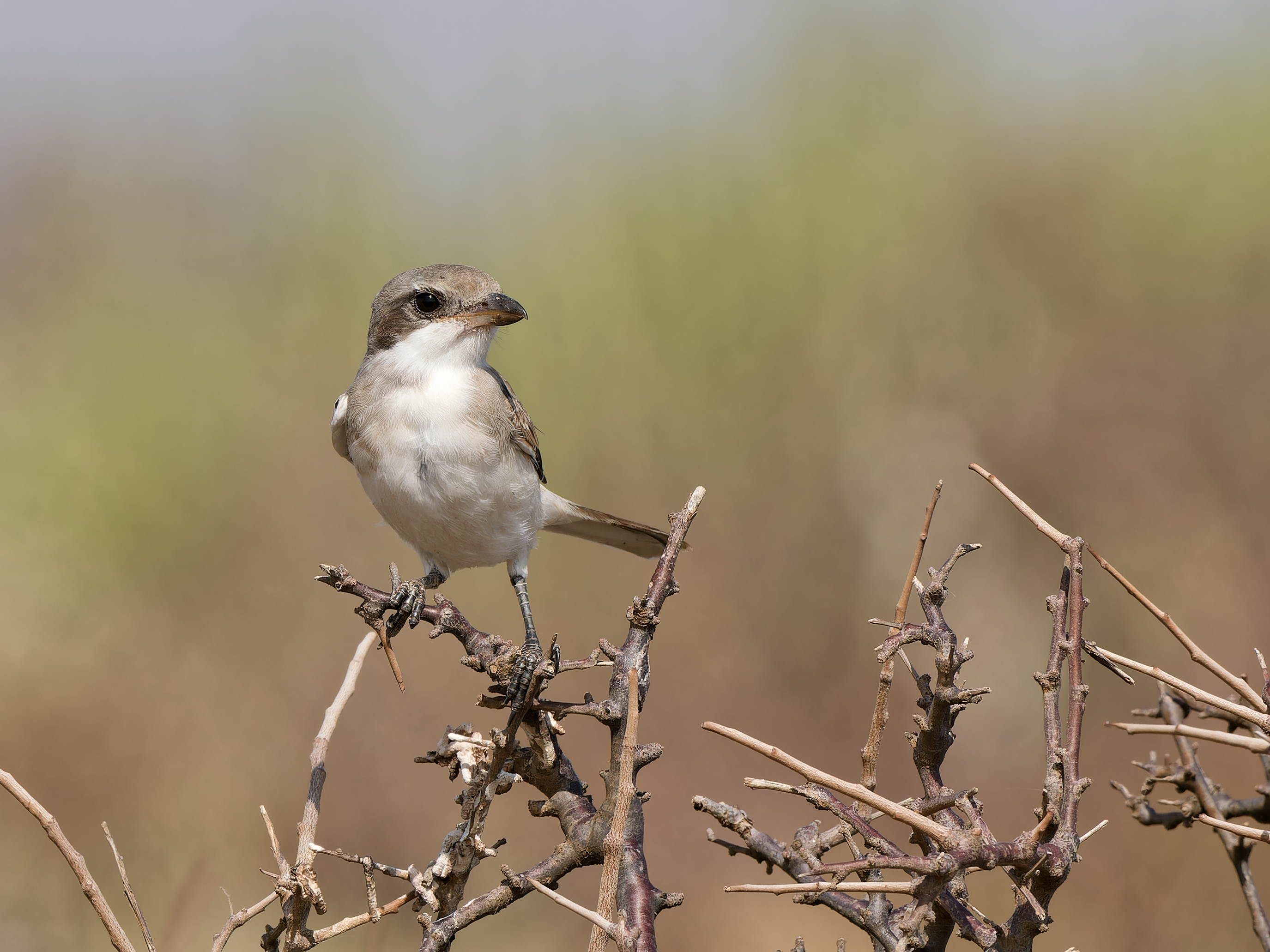
Somali Fiscal

The Somali fiscal (Lanius somalicus) is a species of bird in the family Laniidae. Other common names include the Karoli fiscal, the Somali fiscal shrike and the Somali shrike. The bird is found in Djibouti, Ethiopia and Somalia in the Horn of Africa, as well as in Kenya in the African Great Lakes region. Its natural habitat is subtropical or tropical dry shrubland.

== Distribution and habitat ==
The Somali fiscal Is found in East Africa, its range including much of Somalia, southern Djibouti, eastern and southern Ethiopia, southeastern South Sudan and northern Kenya. It is mainly found in open grassy habitats and semi-desert areas with some scrub. Where its range overlaps that of the Taita fiscal (Lanius dorsalis), that bird usually inhabits more densely-vegetated and less arid habitats.

== Ecology ==
Like other shrikes, the Somali fiscal perches in a position where it has a good view all round and pounces on any suitable prey it observes. It feeds mostly on large insects such as grasshoppers, mantises and beetles. Prey is sometimes impaled on thorns for consumption later, and small birds have sometimes been found in these larders. During the breeding season, it will defend the area around its nest, being prepared to attack any bird that ventures near up to the size of a raven. Breeding usually takes place in the rainy season. The nest is usually in a bush, some 1 to 1.5 m (3 to 5 ft) above the ground, with a clutch of four, or sometimes three, eggs being laid. Little is known of incubation and fledging times.

== Status ==
The Somali fiscal has a wide range and is reported to be common in places. The population trend appears to be steady so the International Union for Conservation of Nature has listed the species as being of "least concern".
