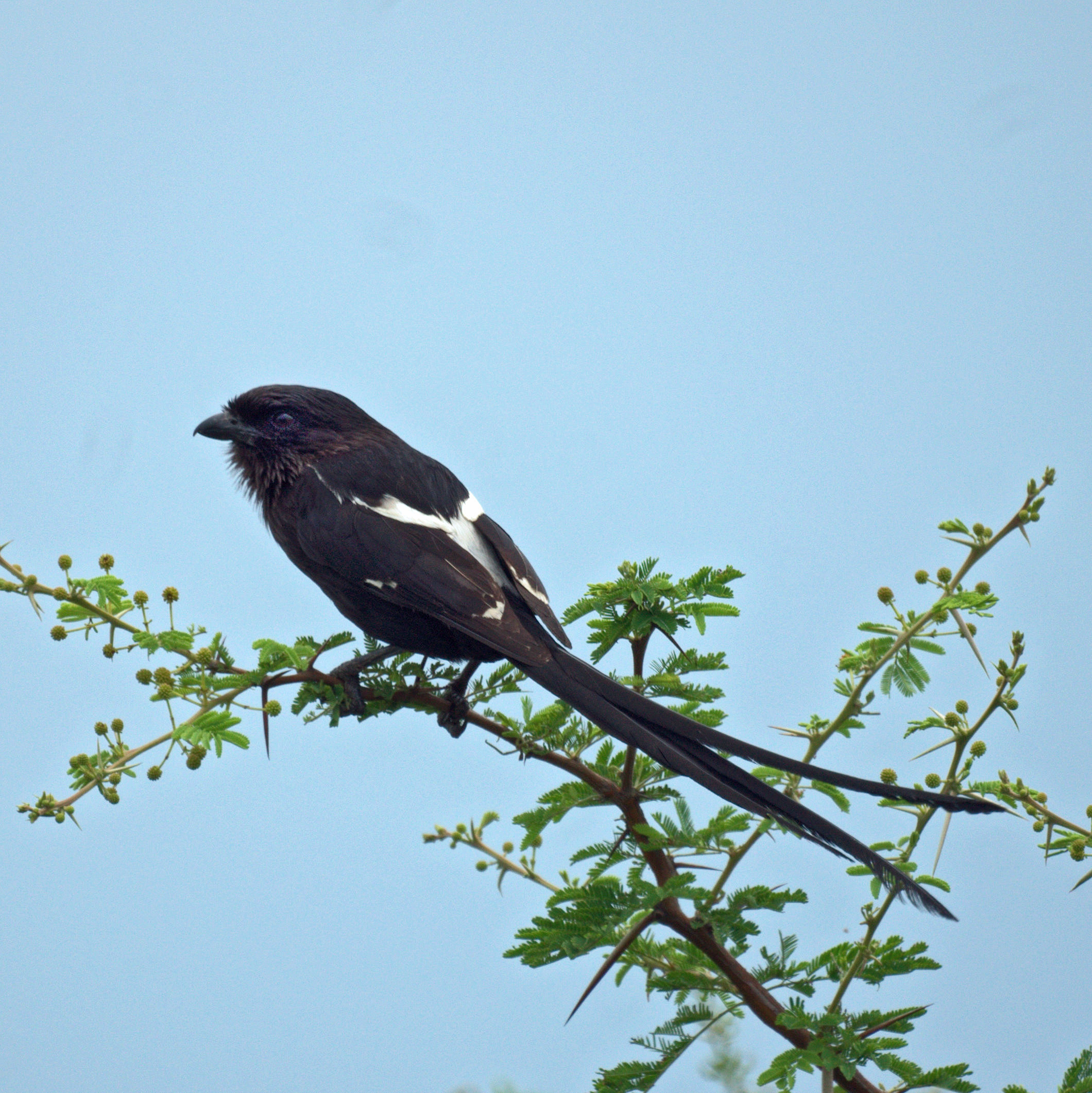
- Urolestes melanoleucus at Sabi Sand

Conservation status
- Least Concern (IUCN 3.1)

Scientific classification
- Kingdom: Animalia
- Phylum: Chordata
- Class: Aves
- Order: Passeriformes
- Family: Laniidae
- Genus: Urolestes; Cabanis, 1851
- Species: U. melanoleucus

Binomial name
- Urolestes melanoleucus (Jardine, 1831)

Synonyms
- Corvinella melanoleuca; Lanius melanoleucus (protonym)

Audio
- Calls of the nominate subspecies in Gauteng

= Magpie shrike =

Species of bird

The magpie shrike (Urolestes melanoleucus), also known as the African long-tailed shrike, is a species of bird in the family Laniidae. It is the only species placed in the genus Urolestes. It is native to the grasslands of eastern and southeastern Africa, where its natural habitats are dry savannah, moist savannah, and subtropical or tropical dry shrubland. It has a very wide range and is common in places, and the International Union for Conservation of Nature has assessed its conservation status as being of "least concern".

== Taxonomy ==
The magpie shrike was formally described in 1831 as Lanius melanoleucus by the English naturalist William Jardine based on three specimens collected by Andrew Smith near the Orange River in South Africa. The specific epithet combines the Ancient Greek μελανος/melanos meaning "black" with λευκος/leukos meaning "white". The genus Urolestes was introduced in 1851 by the German ornithologist Jean Cabanis to accommodate a single species, the magpie shrike. The genus name combines the Ancient Greek ουρα/oura meaning "tail" with λῃστης/lēistēs meaning "robber" (i.e. shrike). Based on the results of molecular genetic studies, this species has sometimes been placed in the genus Lanius, but the phylogenetic relationships are poorly resolved and the taxon sampling is incomplete.

Three subspecies are recognised:

- Urolestes melanoleucus aequatorialis Reichenow, A, 1887 – eastern Africa (north of the Zambezi River) northward to Kenya
- Urolestes melanoleucus expressus (Clancey, PA, 1961) – southeastern Zimbabwe to northeastern South Africa (Mpumalanga and northeastern KwaZulu-Natal), eastern Eswatini, and southern Mozambique
- Urolestes melanoleucus melanoleucus (Jardine, W, 1831) – Africa south of the Zambezi River to eastern Angola and north-central South Africa

== Distribution and habitat ==
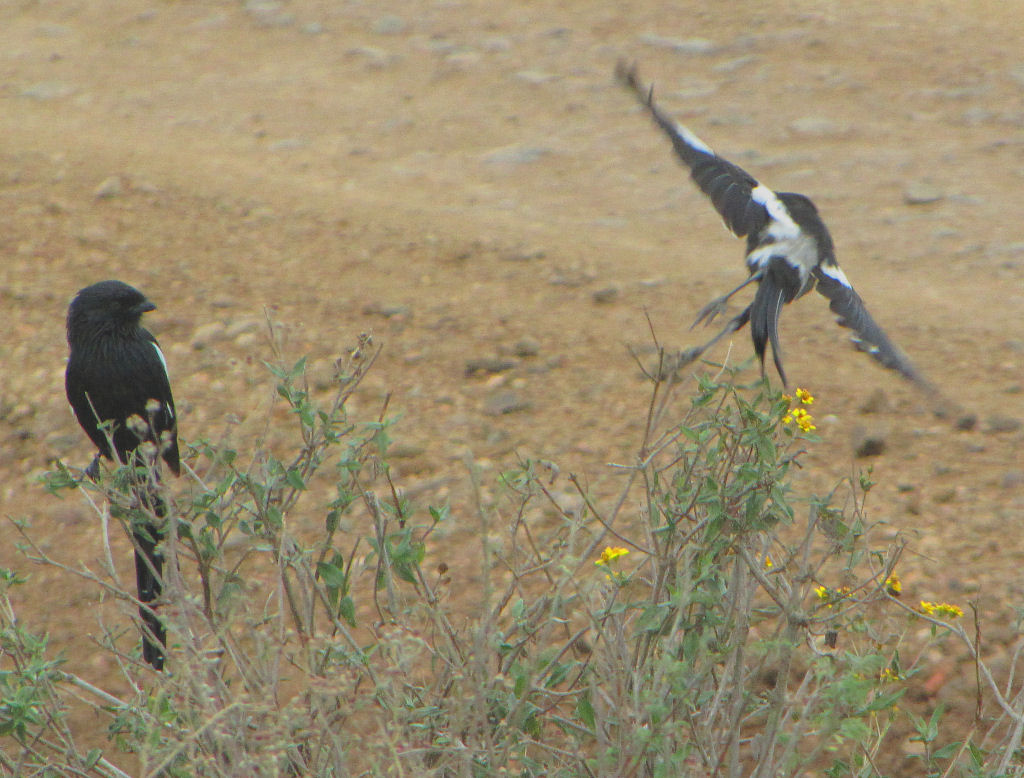
Two magpie shrikes in Serengeti National Park, Tanzania

The magpie shrike is found in Angola, Botswana, Eswatini, Kenya, Mozambique, Namibia, South Africa, Tanzania, Zambia, and Zimbabwe. It inhabits open savannah with scattered acacia trees, close-grazed turf and bare ground, in parts of southern and central Africa where precipitation mainly occurs between November and April. Arid areas are avoided but semi-arid areas may be favoured. It also occurs in woodland, particularly riparian areas, and in the Kruger National Park is found in river valleys with thorny mopane trees.

== Ecology ==
The magpie shrike is a gregarious species and usually occurs in noisy groups of about a dozen birds occupying a home range of several tens of hectares. It may associate with other birds such as the white-headed buffalo weaver (Dinemellia dinemelli). The birds nest cooperatively during the rainy season, and their breeding territory is about three hectares and defended from other groups. Displays in the breeding season include bowing, tail flicking, wing raising and whistling. The female sometimes calls from the nest and the male brings her food. The two birds may also perform duets.

This bird perches in an elevated position scanning the ground below for possible prey. Most prey is caught on the ground, but flying insects are sometimes caught in mid air. The diet consists of arthropods, insects, lizards, small mammals and fruit.
