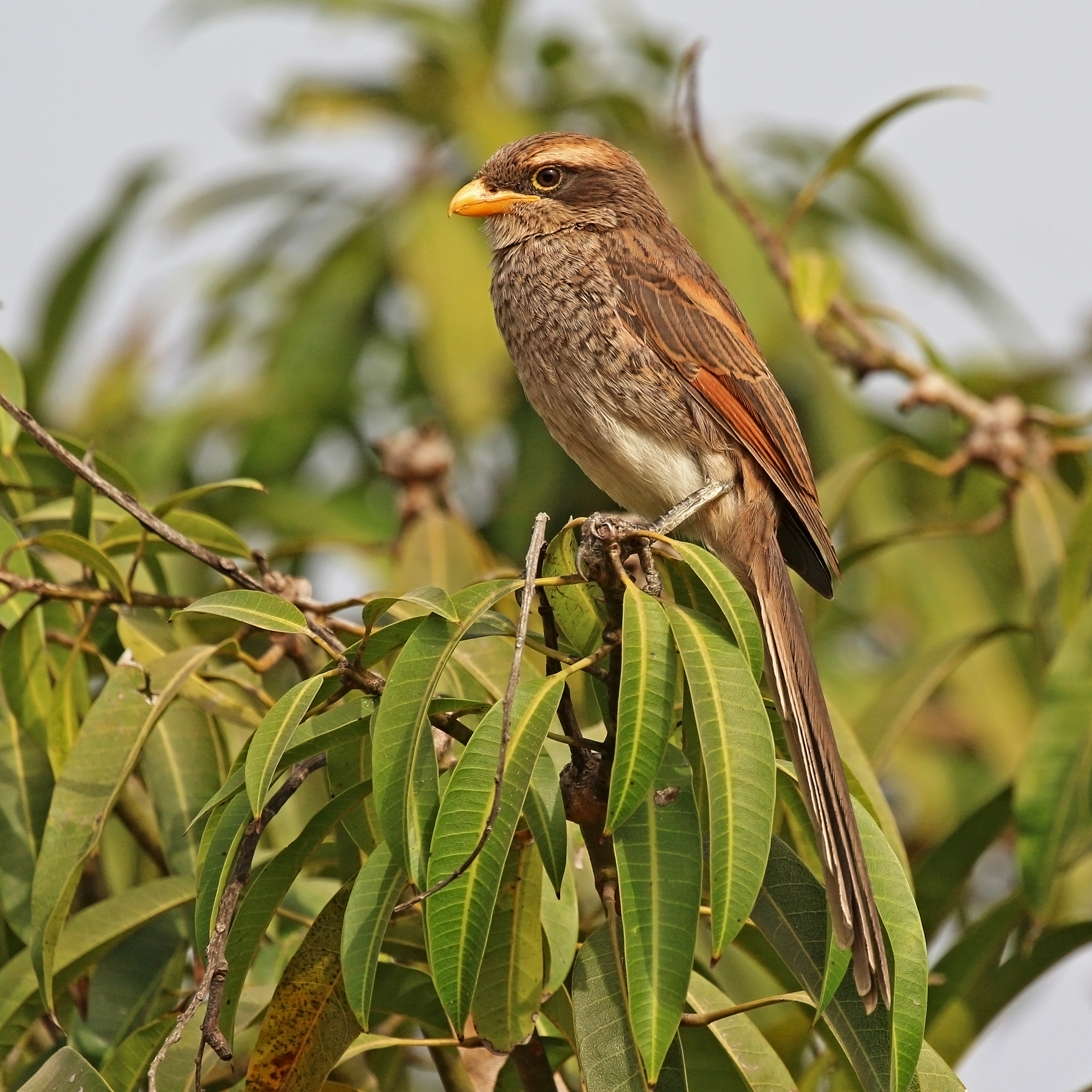
- In the Gambia

Conservation status
- Least Concern (IUCN 3.1)

Scientific classification
- Kingdom: Animalia
- Phylum: Chordata
- Class: Aves
- Order: Passeriformes
- Family: Laniidae
- Genus: Corvinella; Lesson, 1831
- Species: C. corvina

Binomial name
- Corvinella corvina (Shaw, 1809)

Synonyms
- Lanius corvinus

= Yellow-billed shrike =

Species of bird

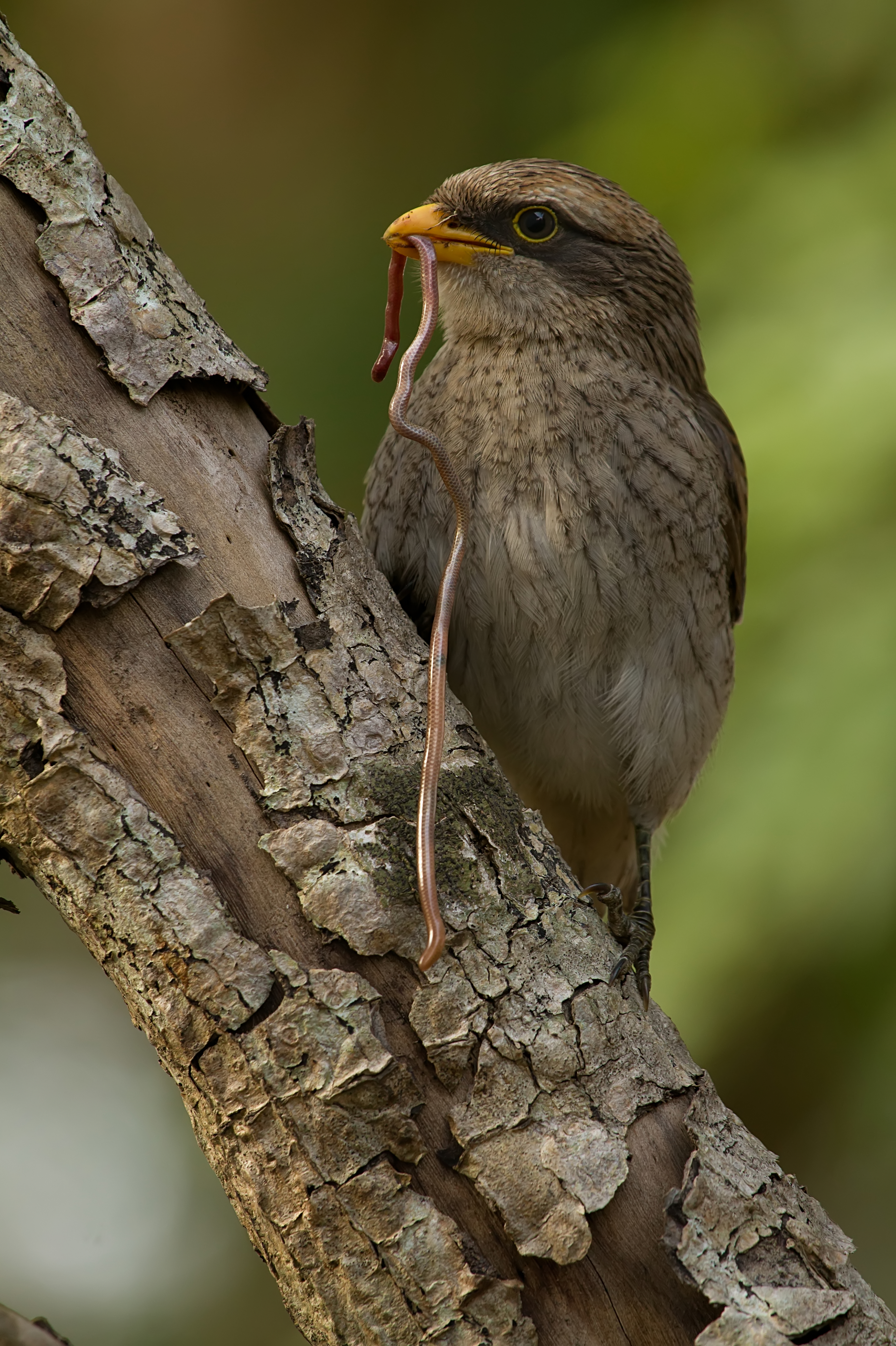
With prey at University of Ghana, Accra, Ghana

The yellow-billed shrike (Corvinella corvina) is a large passerine bird in the shrike family. It is sometimes known as the long-tailed shrike, but this invites confusion with the long-tailed shrike, Lanius schach, of tropical southern Asia. It is the only species placed in the genus Corvinella. The yellow-billed shrike is a common resident breeding bird in tropical Africa from Senegal eastwards to Uganda and locally in westernmost Kenya. It frequents forest and other habitats with trees.

== Taxonomy ==
The yellow-billed shrike was formally described in 1809 as Lanius corvinus by the English naturalist George Shaw. The specific epithet is from Latin meaning "raven-like". Shaw based his account on "La Grande-pie-grieche" that had been described and illustrated in 1799 by the French naturalist François Levaillant. Levaillant had acquired a preserved specimen from a dealer and did not know its origin. In 1831 the French naturalist René Lesson introduced the genus Corvinella to accommodate the yellow-billed shrike and also designated the type location as Senegal. Based on the results of molecular genetic studies, this species has sometimes been placed in the genus Lanius, but the phylogenetic relationships are poorly resolved and taxon sampling is incomplete.

Three subspecies are recognised:

- C. c. corvina (Shaw, G, 1809) – southern Mauritania and Senegal to Mali and northwestern Nigeria
- C. c. togoensis Neumann, OR, 1900 – Guinea and Sierra Leone to southern Chad and Sudan (Darfur)
- C. c. affinis Hartlaub, KJG, 1857 – southwestern and southern South Sudan, northeastern Democratic Republic of the Congo, northern Uganda, and western Kenya

== Description ==
The yellow-billed shrike is 32 cm (13 in) with a long, graduating tail and short wings. The adult has mottled brown upperparts and streaked buff underparts. It has a brown eye mask and a rufous wing patch, and the bill is yellow. Sexes are largely similar, but females have maroon patches on the flanks, while males have rufous parches; these patches are only visible when the bird is in flight, displaying, engaging in territorial disputes, or preening. Immature birds show buff fringes to the wing feathers. The legs and feet are black, and the beak is yellow, even in juveniles. It is a noisy bird, with harsh swee-swee and dreee-too calls.

== Distribution ==
The species is resident in tropical Africa, south of the Sahara and north of the equator, but is not present in the Horn of Africa. It is present in Benin, Burkina Faso, Cameroon, Central African Republic, Chad, Congo, the Democratic Republic of Congo, Côte d'Ivoire, Gambia, Ghana, Guinea, Guinea-Bissau, Kenya, Mali, Mauritania, Niger, Nigeria, Senegal, Sierra Leone, South Sudan, Sudan, Togo, and Uganda. It makes localised movements, but these have been little studied.

== Behaviour and ecology ==
This is a conspicuous and gregarious bird and a cooperative breeder, always seen in groups, often lined up on telephone wires. The nest is a cup structure in a bush or tree into which four or five eggs are laid. Only one female in a group breeds at a given time, with other members providing protection and food.

The yellow-billed shrike feeds on insects, which it locates from prominent look-out perches in trees, wires, or posts. They also sometimes eat small frogs, reptiles, and mice, but are not known to eat other birds or to form larders.

== Conservation status ==
The yellow-billed shrike is common in some areas and less so in others. No evidence has been found of any substantial decline in its populations, so the International Union for Conservation of Nature has assessed its conservation status as being of least concern.
