= Skrimshire =

Skrimshire is a surname. Notable people with the surname include:

- Baroness Skrimshire of Quarter (1913–1979), Scottish politician
- Fenwick Skrimshire (1774–1855), English naturalist and physician who certified John Clare as mad
- Reg Skrimshire (1878–1930), Welsh rugby player
- William Skrimshire (1766–1829), English surgeon and botanist

== See also ==
- Scrimshaw (surname)
