= Spring vetch =

Spring vetch is a common name for several plants and may refer to:

- Lathyrus vernus, native to Europe and Siberia
- Vicia lathyroides, native to Europe and western Asia
- Vicia sativa
