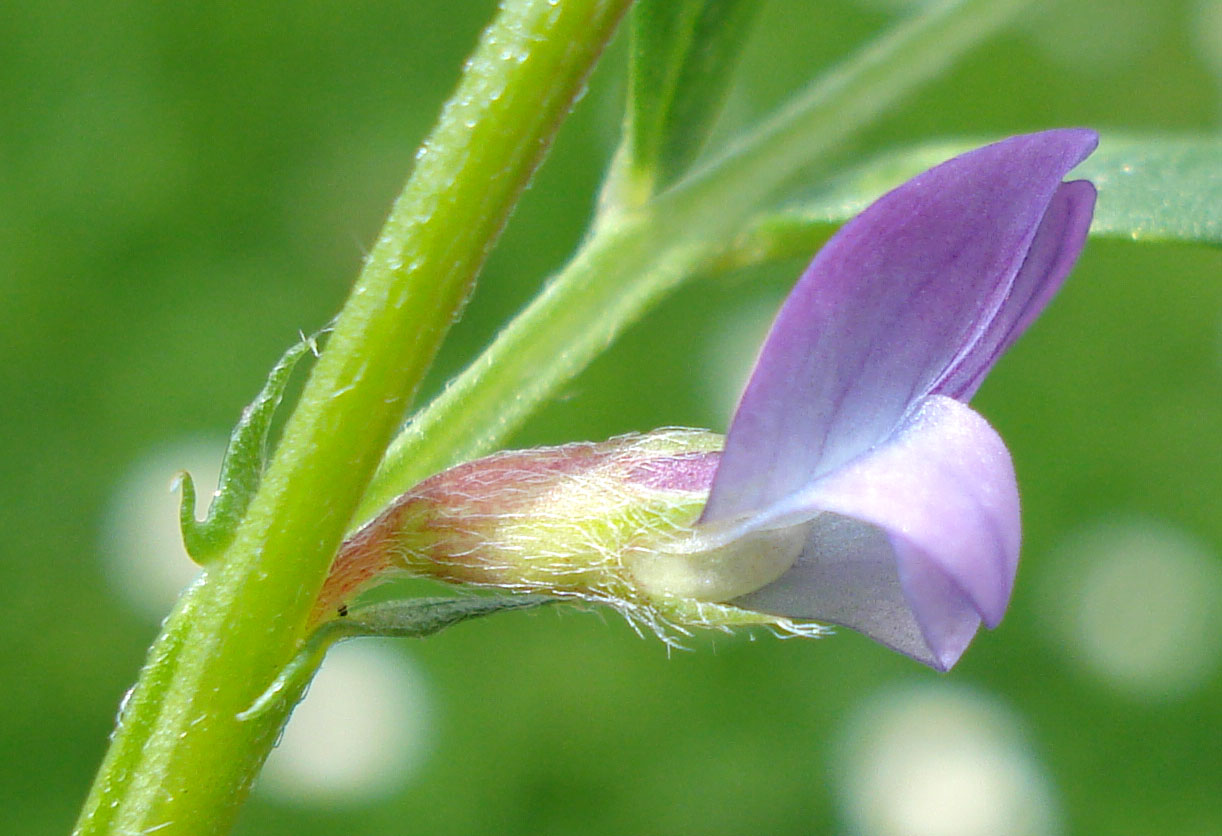

Conservation status
- Least Concern (IUCN 3.1)

Scientific classification
- Kingdom: Plantae
- Clade: Tracheophytes
- Clade: Angiosperms
- Clade: Eudicots
- Clade: Rosids
- Order: Fabales
- Family: Fabaceae
- Subfamily: Faboideae
- Tribe: Fabeae
- Genus: Vicia
- Species: V. lathyroides

Binomial name
- Vicia lathyroides L.

Synonyms
- List: Cracca pauciflora (C. Presl) Gennari; Ervum lathyroides (L.) Stank.; Ervum soloniense L.; Lens soloniensis (L.) Vines & Druce; Vicia angustifolia Hohen.; Vicia arenivaga Lamotte; Vicia minima Gilib.; Vicia multicaulis Wallr.; Vicia olbiensis Reut.; Vicia pauciflora C. Presl; Wiggersia lathyroides (L.) G. Gaertn., B. Mey. & Scherb.; Wiggersia minima Alef.

= Vicia lathyroides =

Species of flowering plant in the bean family

Vicia lathyroides, spring vetch is a flowering plant in the pea family which grows in sandy or rocky places close to the sea or sometimes in similar habitats inland. It is native to Europe, North Africa and western Asia and has spread to some other parts of the world as an introduction. It is a very small plant, easily overlooked, and has no economic uses, but it is often valued as a species of importance for nature conservation.

== Description ==
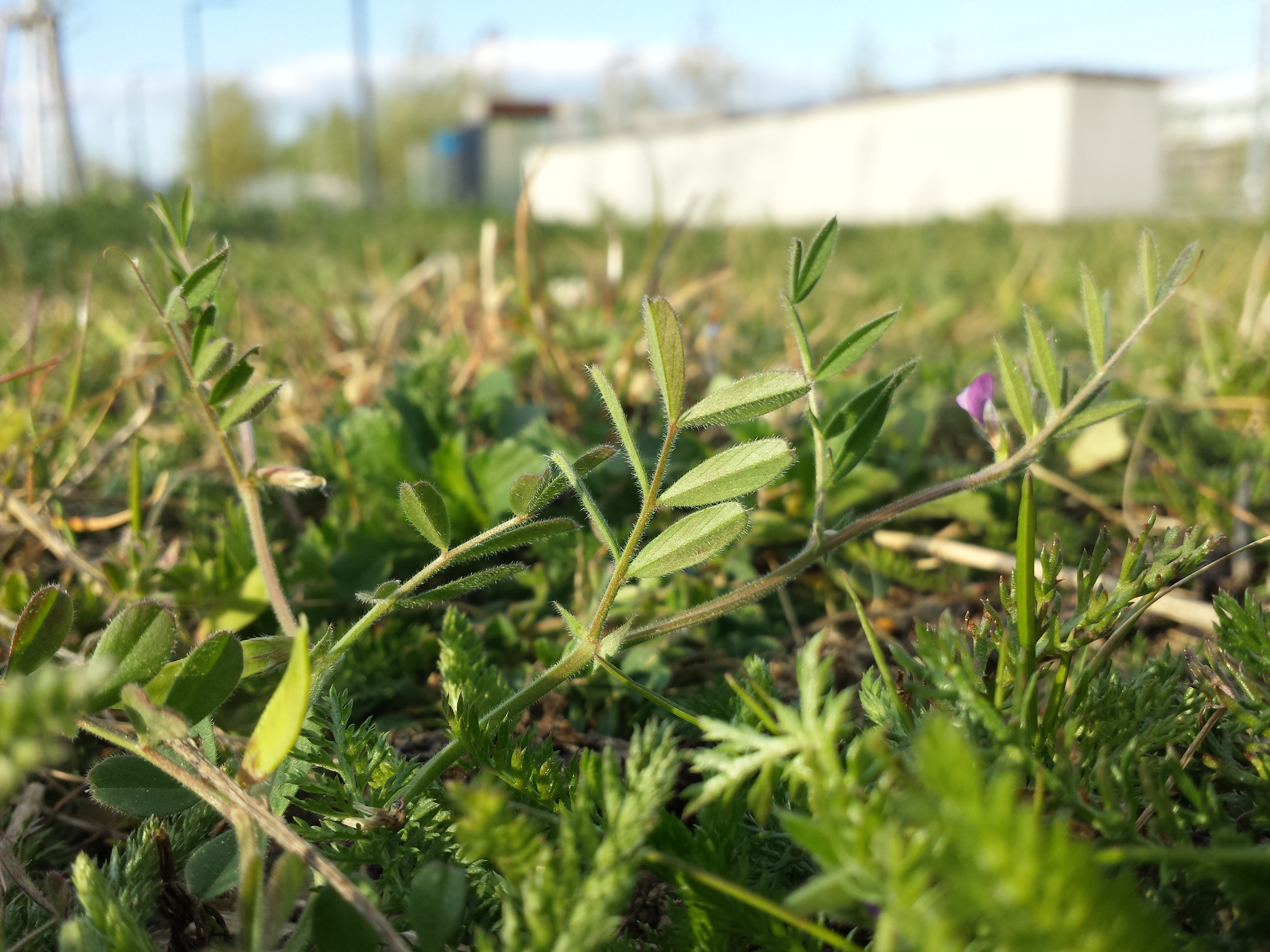
Spring vetch has a sprawling habit in short grassland

Spring vetch is an annual herb with stems typically just a few centimetres long (exceptionally, up to 20 cm), which sprawls amongst other low-growing vegetation. The whole plant (except the pod) is covered in long, non-glandular hairs. The leaves, which are about 2 cm long, are arranged alternately along the stem and are pinnate, with 2-4 (sometimes up to 8) pairs of opposing leaflets in a paripinnate arrangement (i.e. with two leaflets at the end). The rhachis, or midrib, ends in a point or sometimes in a short unbranched tendril. At the base of the leaf stalk there is a small, arrow-shaped stipule.

The inflorescences arise in the axils of the leaves and consist of a single flower on a short (1.5 mm) peduncle. The calyx is hairy, about 2.5 mm long, tube-shaped and divided into 5 equal lobes towards the tip. The corolla is 6-9 mm long, violet to pale purple, and with a typical pea-shape of standard, two wings and a keel. There are 10 stamens, with yellow anthers, and one style. The fruit is a hairless legume (pea pod) about 3 cm long containing typically 6 or 8 (or up to 12) tuberculate seeds in a single row.

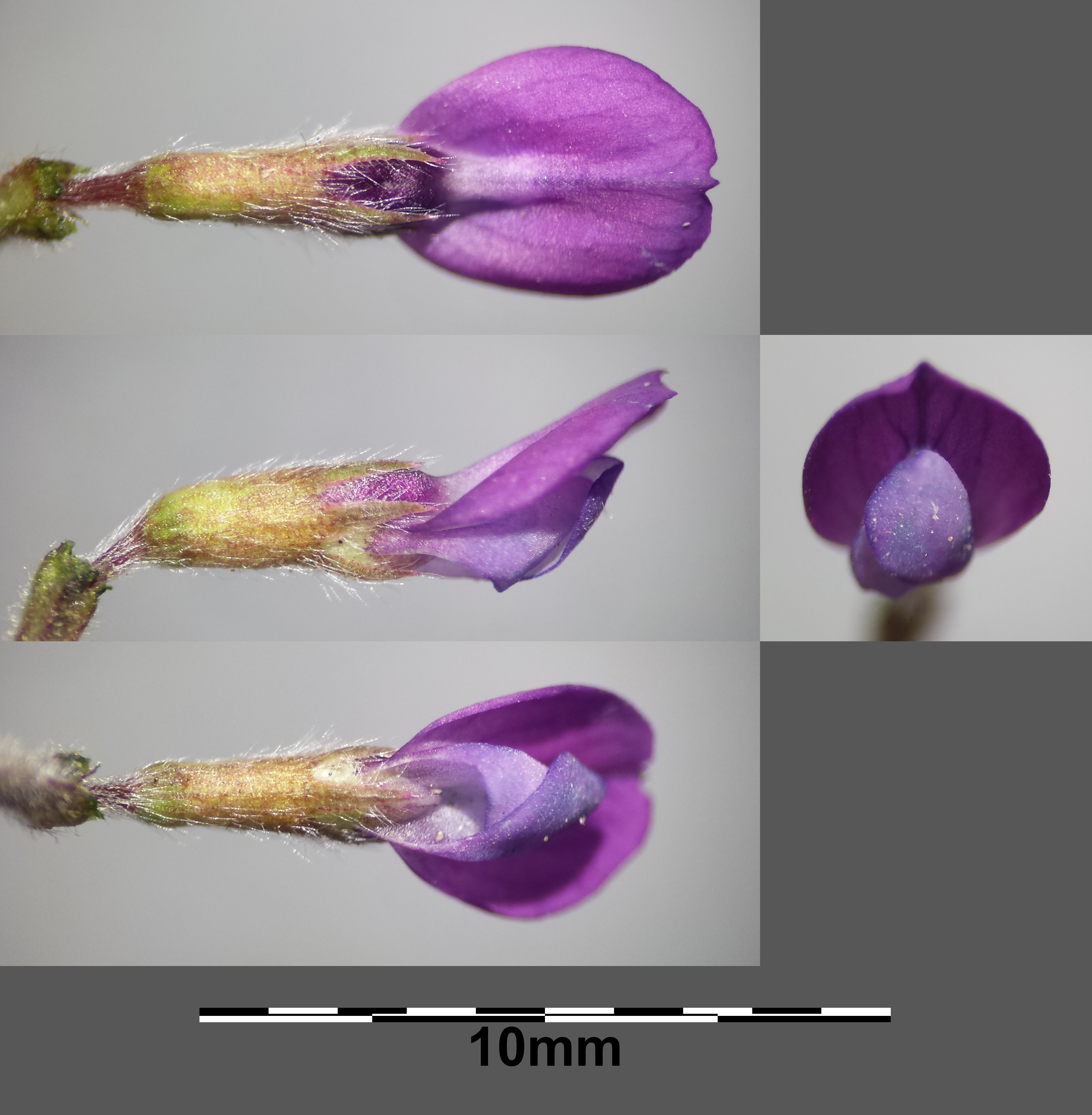
Details of the flower

== Taxonomy ==
The name Vicia lathyroides was used by Carl Linnaeus in 1753 in Species Plantarum, vol. 2, p. 736. although this follows an earlier coinage by Paul Hermann in Paradisus Batavus, which was Vicia lathyroides, purpuro-cæruleis floribus (the little vetch with blueish-purple flowers). Linnaeus described it as Vicia leguminibus sessilibus solitariis erectis glabris, foliolis fenis: inferioribus obcordatis (the vetch with sessile, solitary, erect, glabrous legumes and with small leaves: the lower ones are obcordate). "Vicia" and "lathyrus" are both ancient Roman names for pea-like plants, and "lathyroides" simply means "like a lathyrus".

Its chromosome number is 2n = 10 or 12.

There are no currently accepted subspecies or varieties, and no known hybrids with other species.

== Identification ==
It can sometimes be difficult to separate spring vetch from small plants of narrow-leaved vetch, Vicia sativa ssp. nigra, although that plant usually has its flowers in pairs and leaves alternate, with branched tendrils at their tips. To be certain, it is necessary to check the ripe seeds, which are covered in small bumps (tubercules) in spring vetch but smooth in narrow-leaved vetch.

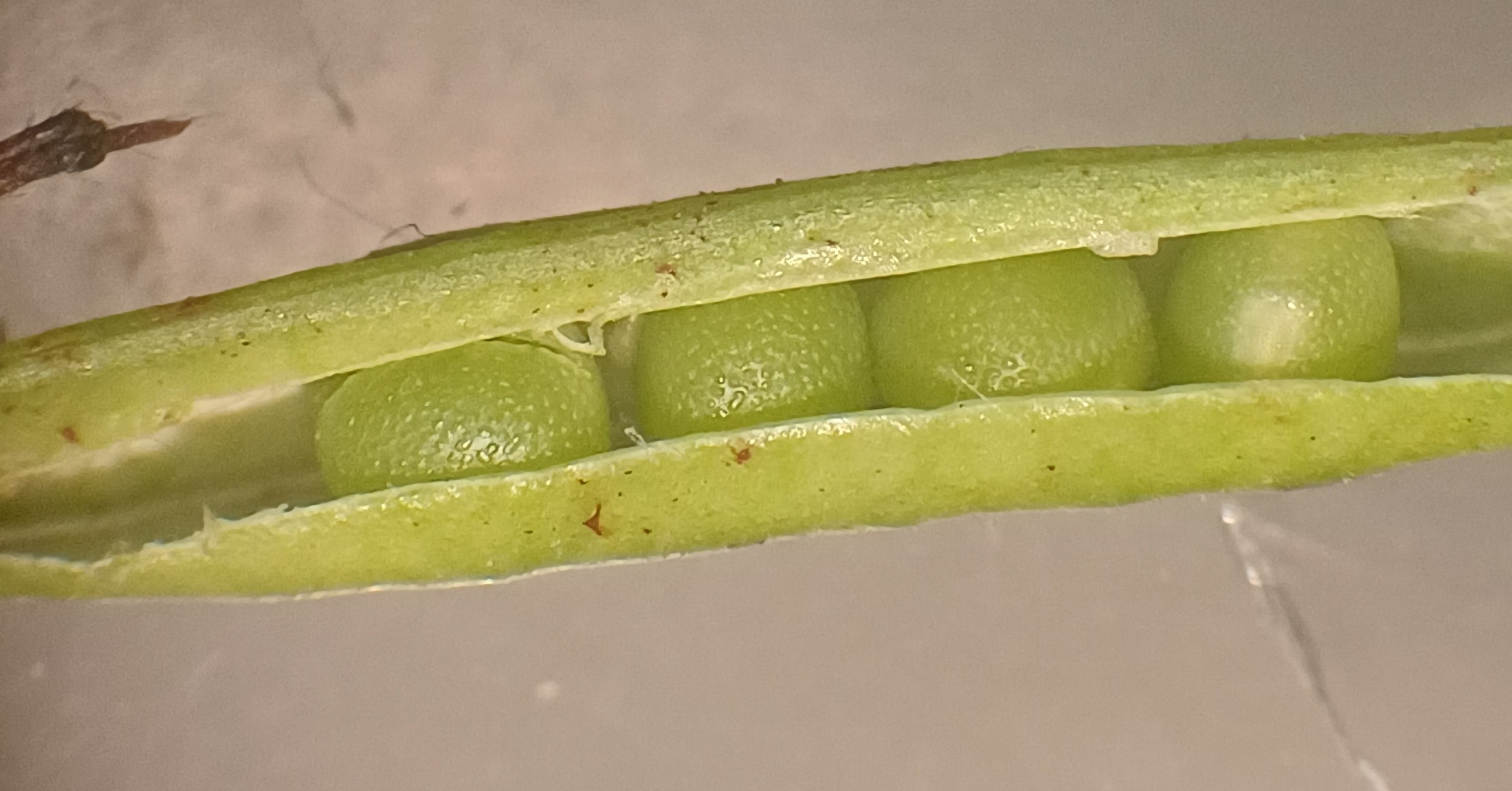
A seed pod containing four tuberculate seeds.

== Distribution and status ==
Spring vetch is native to Europe and adjacent parts of western Asia and north Africa, and it has been introduced to parts of North America and New Zealand.

It has been assessed as LC (least concern) by the IUCN, meaning that it is not under threat globally. It is also classified as LC in Britain, although it is thought to be declining quite rapidly. In most British counties it is considered an axiophyte, a plant indicative of areas of high conservation importance.

== Habitat and ecology ==
This is a plant of short grassland on free-draining sandy or stony ground near the sea or sometimes inland. It is a classic spring ephemeral, or therophyte, flowering and seeding early in the year (April-May in northern Europe) and dying back by summer. It is largely restricted to unimproved grassland with high species diversity and low soil nutrients. Its Ellenberg-type indicator values are L = 8, F = 3, R = 5, N = 3, S = 0, T = 7, which reflect how it tends to grow in warm places in full sunlight, with low nutrients and moisture, neutral pH, and no salt. Its continentality score is 5, which suggests neither an oceanic nor a continental climate.

The British vegetation communities it occurs in appear to be mainly U1 Festuca ovina grassland in inland locations, and SD7, SD8 and SD12 dune grassland on the coast. In Europe, it is known in CJ01A Corynephoretalia canescentis, which is described as "silicicolous tussock grasslands on inland sand dunes of the atlantic and subatlantic regions of Western, Central and Eastern Europe", and S34 Balkan-Anatolian submontane genistoid scrub.

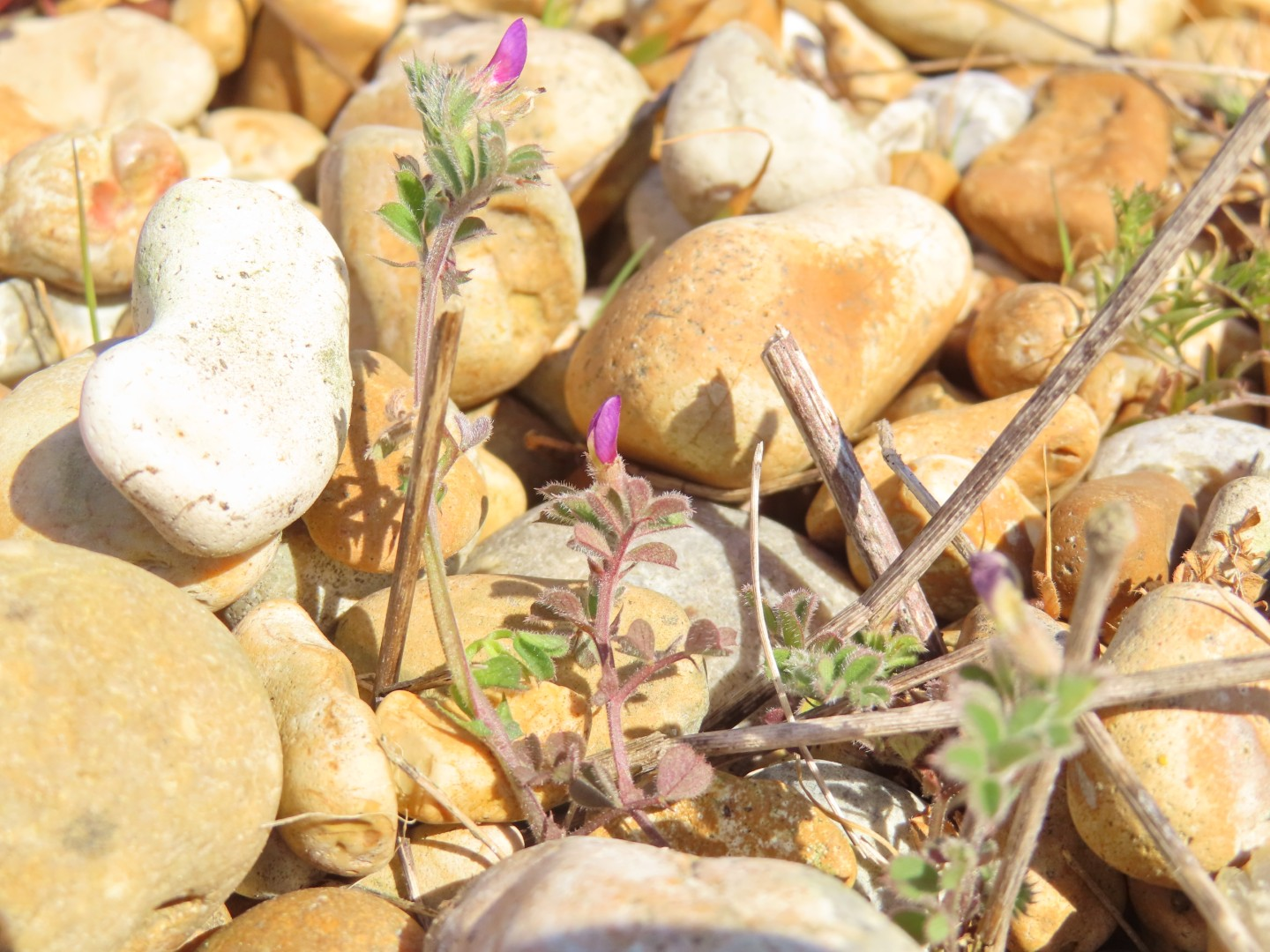
Spring vetch in SD1 shingle vegetation at Dungeness

Only one species of insect has been recorded feeding on spring vetch: the weevil Sitona macularius, whose larvae are found on the roots.

The leaves can be infected with fava bean rust or the downy mildew Peronospora ervi.
