= William Skrimshire =

English botanist and surgeon (1766–1829)

William Skrimshire (the younger), (1766 in Wisbech – 22 July 1829) was a surgeon and botanist. He amassed a large herbarium with the help of his brother, Fenwick Skrimshire, although much of it has subsequently been lost. As a surgeon he worked alongside his father at a practice in Ship Lane. After his father's death Skrimshire moved to the edge of the town and there he grew native and exotic plants in his garden and a peppermint plantation. A manuscript catalogue of his collection is all that remains, although it does contain some important first records for Cambridgeshire and Northamptonshire. In 1818 Skrimshire sold the herbarium to Viscount Milton, but continued to gather specimens

174 botanical specimens he collected including Origanum vulgare are held in the Wisbech & Fenland Museum.

He is commemorated in Wisbech by the walkway named Scrimshires Passage.

== Publications ==
- On the Absorption of Electric Light by different Bodies – Nicholson's Journal xv, 281, 1806
- On the Habitudes of Saline Bodies with regard to electricity – Nicholson's Journal xvii, 12, 1807
- On the Phosphorescence of Bodies, from the action of the Electric Explosion – Nicholson's Journal xix, 153, 1808
- On the quantity of Fecula in different varieties of potatoe [sic] – Nicholson's Journal xxi, 71, 1808
- On the Fecula of potatoes and some other British Vegetables – Nicholson's Journal xxi, 182, 1808
- On the late excessive Cold Weather. Philosophical Magazine xlvii, 182, 1816

== Bibliography ==
- F. H. Perring, Proc.B.S.B.I, 1956, 133, and G. Crompton, William Skrimshire' 1766–1829. The Wisbech Society, 55th Annual Report (1994) 17–20;
- G. Crompton, Postscript to 'William Skrimshire', The Wisbech Society, 57th Annual Report (1996)
- G. Crompton & E. C. Nelson, The herbarium of William Skrimshire (1766–1829) of Wisbech. Watsonia, (2000) 23:23–38.
