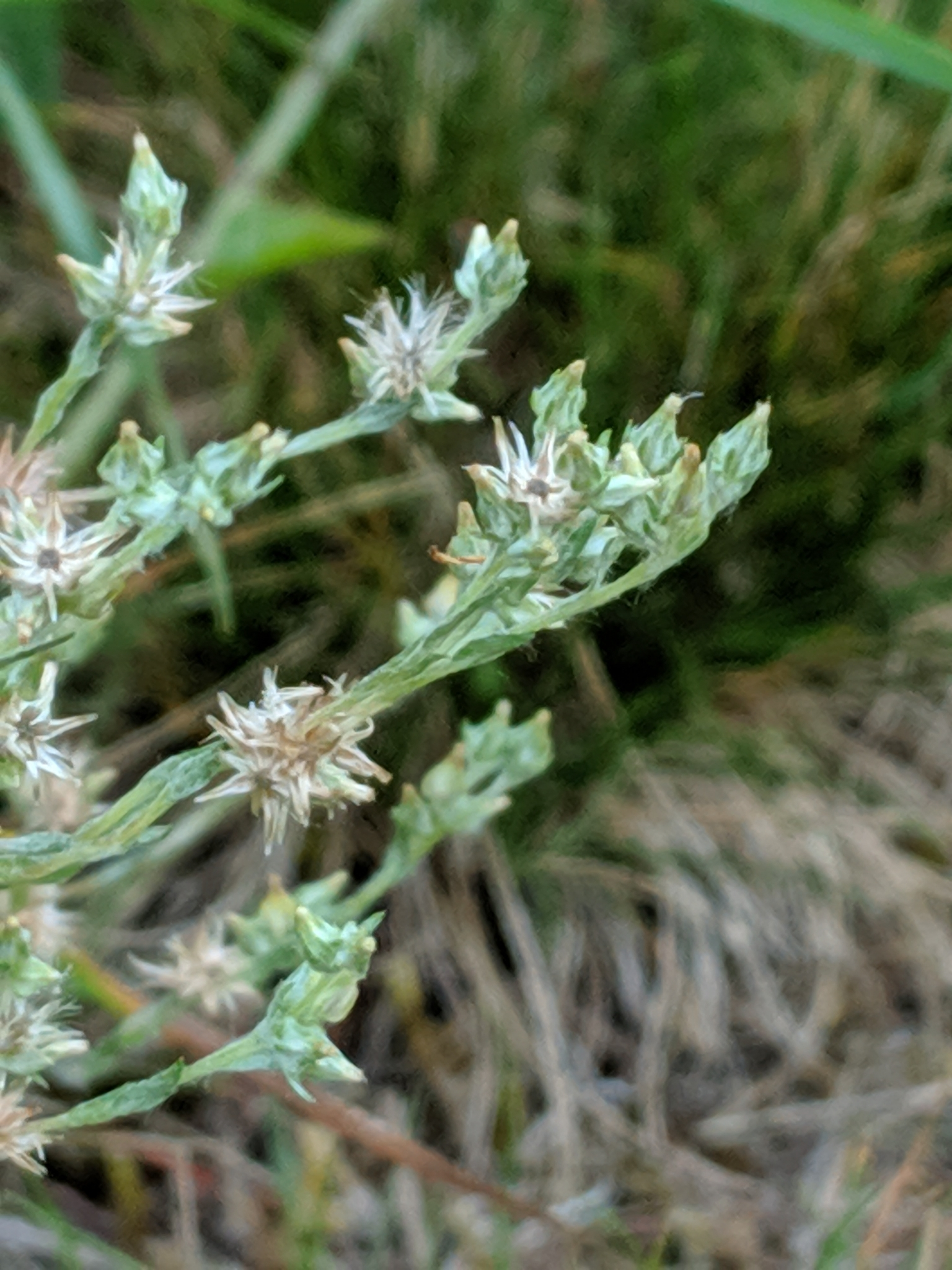
- Logfia minima

Scientific classification
- Kingdom: Plantae
- Clade: Tracheophytes
- Clade: Angiosperms
- Clade: Eudicots
- Clade: Asterids
- Order: Asterales
- Family: Asteraceae
- Subfamily: Asteroideae
- Tribe: Gnaphalieae
- Genus: Logfia; Cass.

Synonyms
- Xerotium Bluff & Fingerh.

= Logfia =

Genus of flowering plants

Logfia is a genus of herbaceous plants in the tribe Gnaphalieae of the family Asteraceae, known as cottonrose.

Some cottonrose species were formerly classified under the genera Filago and/or Oglifa.

== Species ==
The following species are recognised in the genus Logfia:

- Logfia clementei (Willk.) Holub — Canary Islands, southern Spain, Morocco and Algeria.
- Logfia gallica (L.) Coss. & Germ. — narrowleaf cottonrose; native to Macaronesia, Europe to Mediterranean and Caucasus. Introduced to Great Britain, western U.S. and Mexico, and Australia
- Logfia heterantha (Raf.) Holub — Corsica, Sardinia, Sicily and north-western Africa.
- Logfia minima (Sm.) Dumort. — small cudweed; native to Macaronesia, Europe and north-western Africa. Introduced to the United States.
