= British NVC community U1 =

UK plant community type

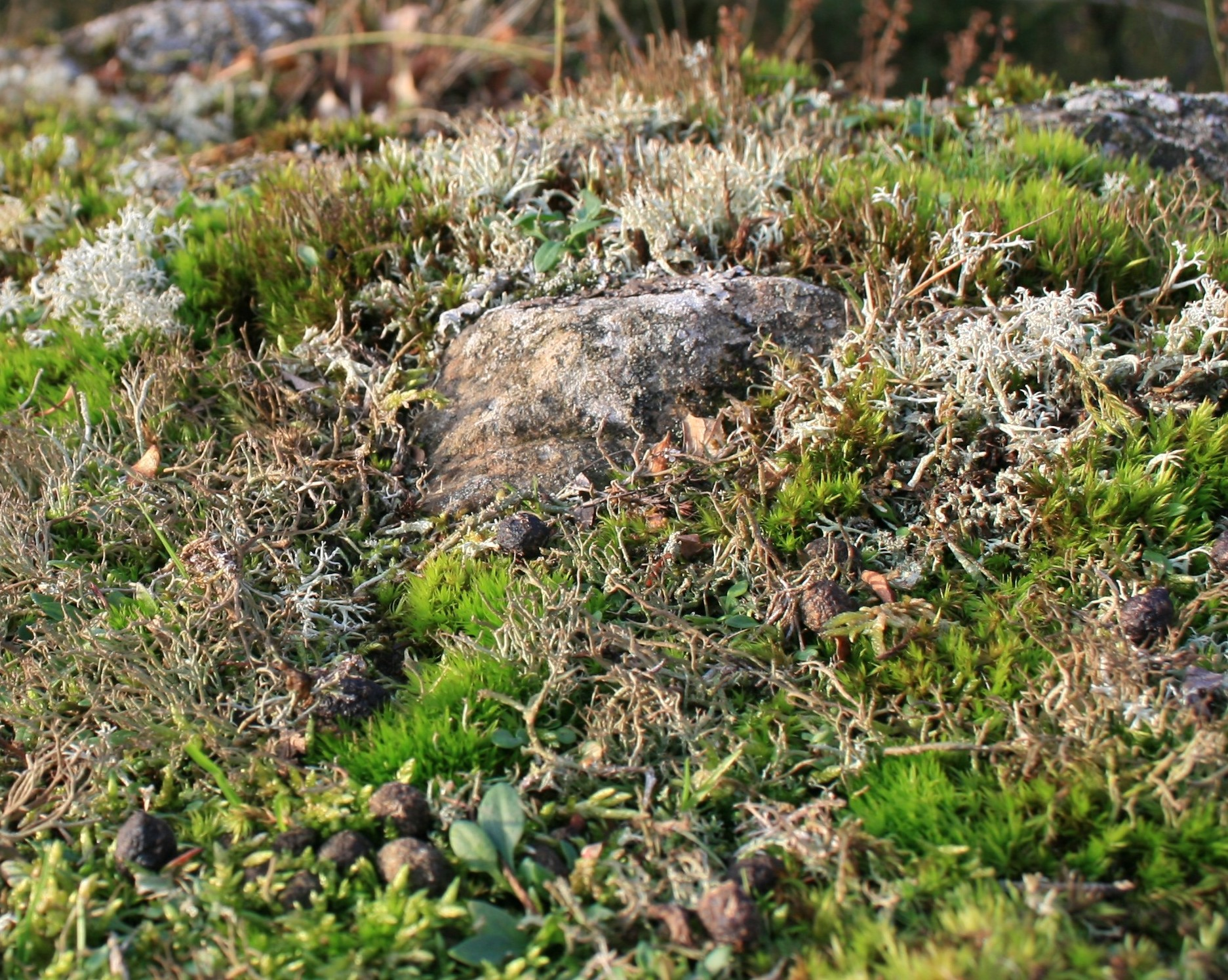
U1 grassland in winter on Haughmond Hill, Shropshire

NVC community U1 is one of the calcifugous grassland communities in the British National Vegetation Classification system, characterised by a short grassy sward of sheep's fescue and common bent with usually abundant sheep's-sorrel and a host of other small grasses and forbs. In the winter and early spring bryophytes and lichens are often prominent or even dominant, but the thin, sandy or rocky soils tend to dry out in summer, leaving a high proportion of bare ground. This type of grassland is important for numerous rare plant species. It is now a rare and threatened habitat in lowland agricultural areas, but is still abundant in the hills of England and Wales, as far north as the borders.

== Description ==
U1 Festuca ovina - Agrostis capillaris - Rumex acetosella grassland is widespread in the lowlands and upland fringes of England, Wales and southern Scotland. It occurs on well-drained, rather acidic, sandy or rocky soils, often in warm situations such as south-facing hillsides, mainly in areas with under 1000 mm rain and fewer than 140 wet days per year. It is a very low-growing and rather patchy type of grassland, often closely grazed by sheep and rabbits, and typically with a high proportion of forbs and cryptogams in the sward. In the summer a high proportion of the plants die back or go to seed, leaving expanses of bare ground.

The main grasses are sheep's-fescue and common bent with annuals such as early hair-grass and annual meadow-grass. Where the soil is slightly richer other perennials can make an appearance, such as red fescue, wavy hair-grass and sweet vernal-grass, but a high proportion of these species would indicate a transition towards a different NVC community.

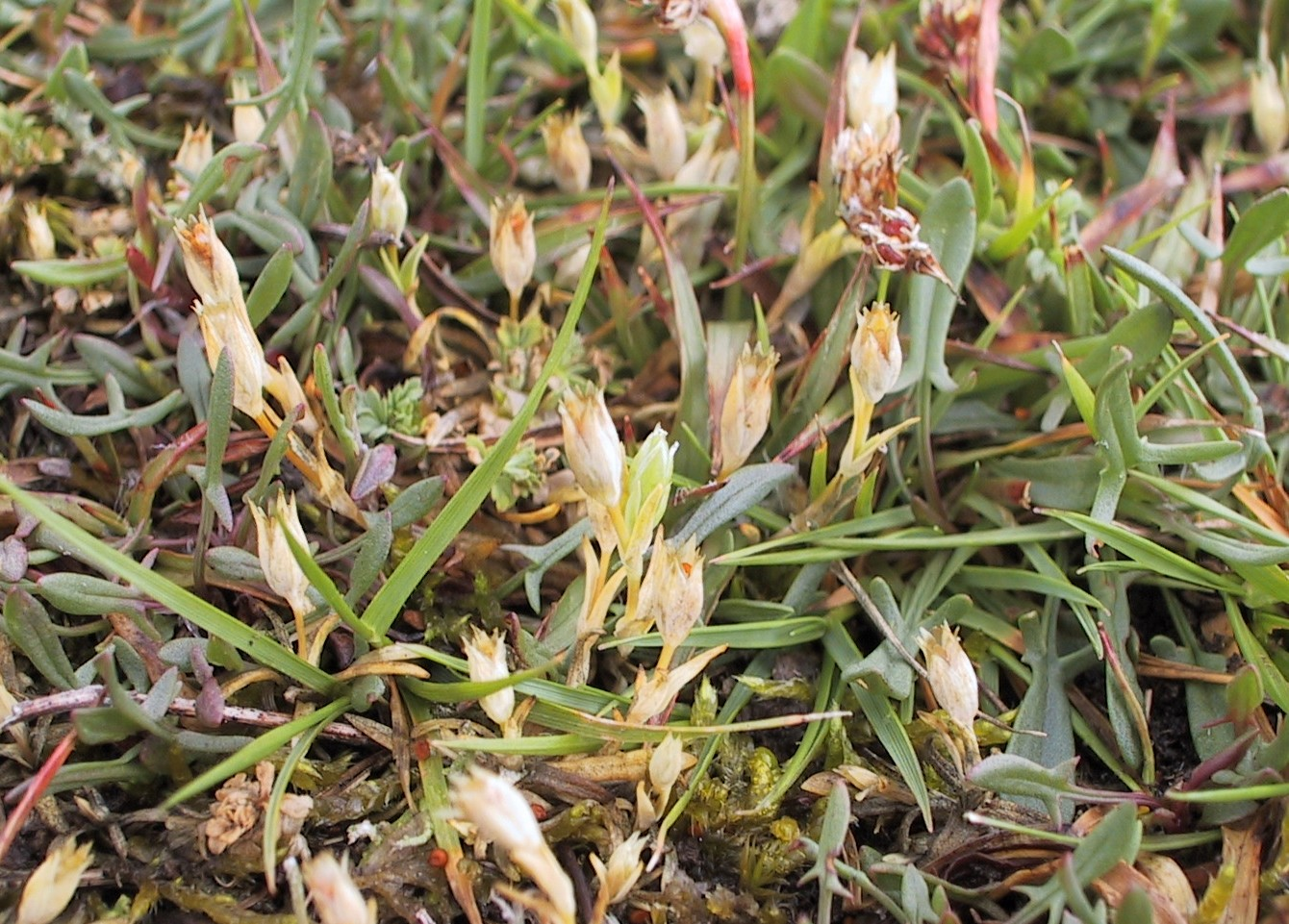
Upright chickweed in a sward of U1 grassland

Some of the most common dicots are the perennials ribwort plantain, common mouse-ear, common cat's-ear and ragwort, but this community is most notable for its annuals, which in many areas are rarely found anywhere else: slender parsley-piert, little mouse-ear, blinks, early forget-me-not, lesser chickweed and wall speedwell are typical. Rarer than these, but still highly characteristic, are smooth cat's-ear, small cudweed, upright chickweed, bird's-foot and shepherd's-cress.

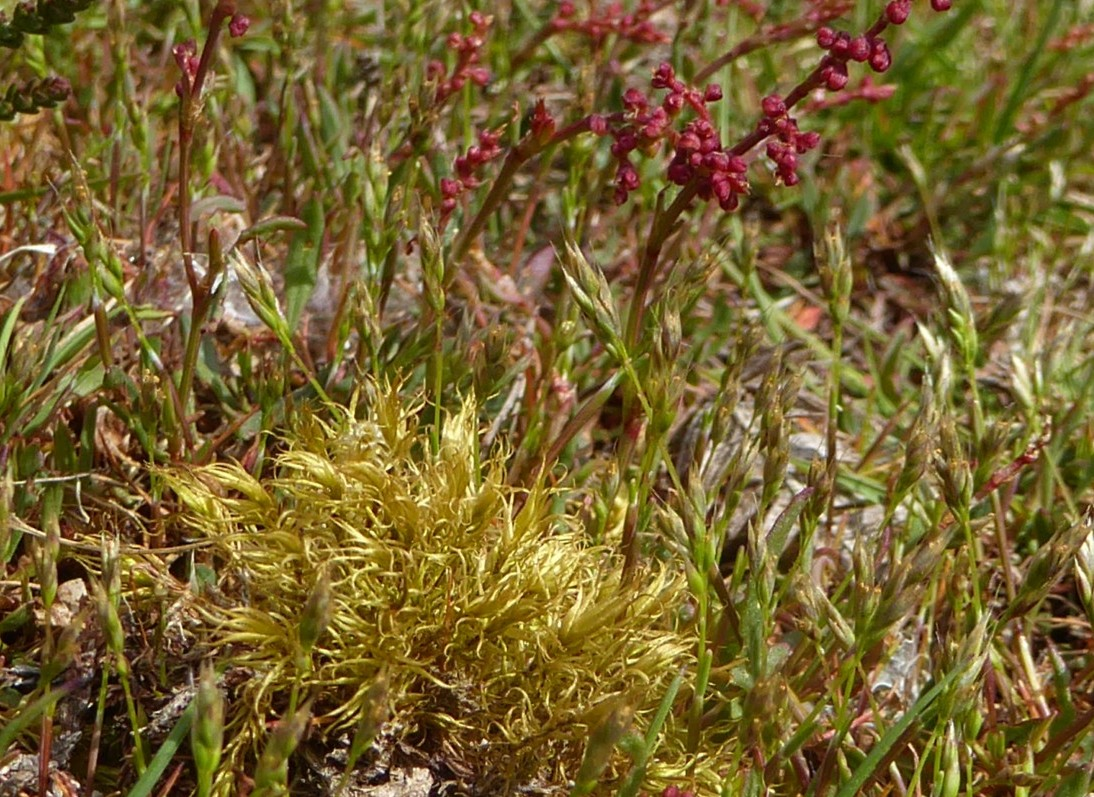
Dicranum scoparium in U1 grassland at Hothfield Heath, Kent

There is generally an abundance of bryophytes and/or lichens in U1 grassland, especially over the winter and early spring. Hypnum cupressiforme, Dicranum scoparium and Ceratodon purpureus are common, as are Polytrichum juniperinum and P. piliferum. The lichens known as reindeer-moss (mostly Cladonia spp.) are often present, and in some situations overwhelmingly abundant. These include Cladonia arbuscula, Cladonia portentosa and Cladonia uncialis.

== Distribution and status ==
U1 Rumex acetosella grassland is found throughout the lowlands of England and Wales, extending into the uplands in many places. It is rare in the north of England and just makes it into the Scottish borders, although the total extent of unimproved U1 in Scotland is estimated at just 34 ha. It occurs on sandy soils or shales that are very free-draining. The unusual form that occurs at Dungeness grows on a sand and flint cobble substrate that is low in nutrients and moisture.

In the west of Wales, around the village of Borth, a very rich form of sheep-grazed U1 containing sea stork's-bill and upright chickweed stretches for kilometres along the coast.

In Biodiversity Net Gain, U1 grassland can be considered a habitat of high distinctiveness, which gives it a high valuation for planning purposes. As a type of lowland acid grassland, it was a Biodiversity Action Plan Habitat (now classed as a Priority Habitat under the NERC Act 2006). Numerous Sites of Special Scientific Interest (SSSIs) and Special Areas of Conservation (SACs) have been designated, at least partially, for their U1 grassland, such as Lakenheath Warren, Haughmond Hill, Prees Heath, Dungeness, and Sutton Park.

== Zonation and succession ==
In Breckland, U1 grassland is now found mostly in small patches amongst the more calcareous CG7 Thymus praecox/pulegioides grassland. Elsewhere, it is often close to the more mesotrophic MG5 Festuca rubra grassland, which is what it is likely to succeed to as the soil builds up. Coastal U1 can be very similar to MC5 Armeria maritima therophyte heath.

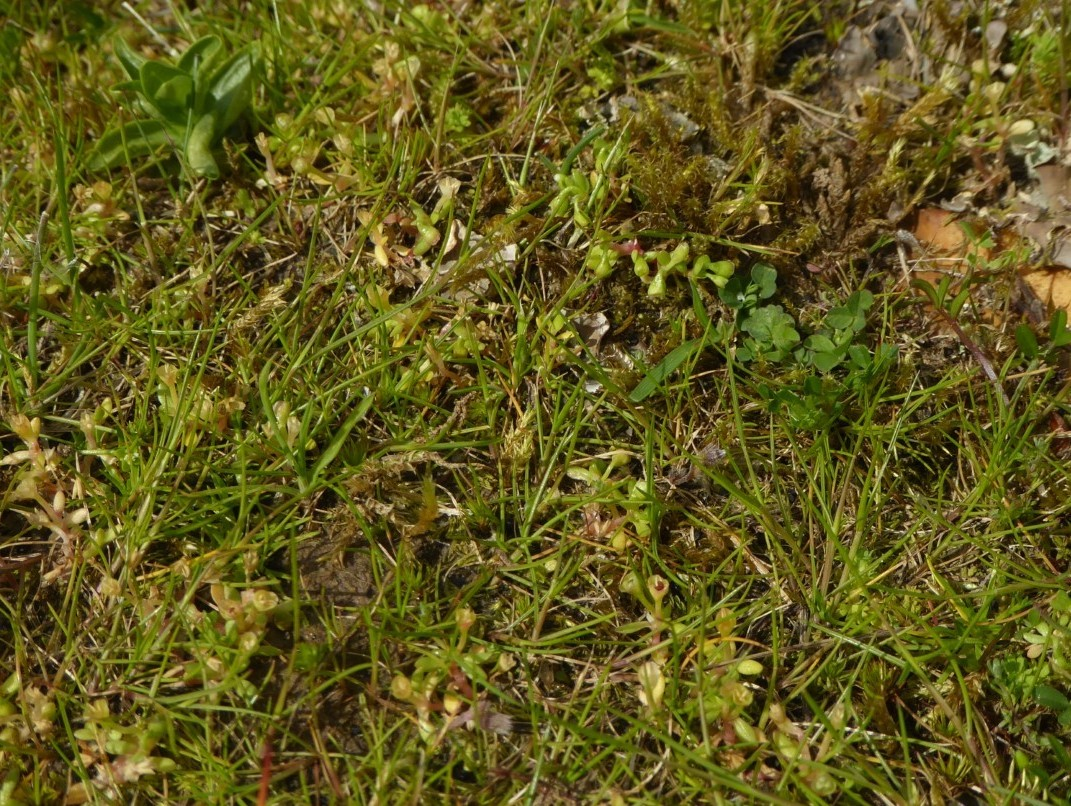
U1 grassland with blinks at a disused quarry

== Subcommunities ==
There are six subcommunities:

- U1a Cornicularia aculeata-Cladonia arbuscula community is rich in lichens and was originally recorded mainly in the Breckland;
- U1b typical subcommunity is a sandy, somewhat bare vegetation type on sand, mainly found in East Anglia and containing rarities such as Breckland thyme, sand catchfly and perennial knawel;
- U1c Erodium cicutarium-Teesdalia nudicaulis is the more species-rich variant, found throughout Britain, containing the characteristic uncommon plants;
- U1d Anthoxanthum odoratum-Lotus corniculatus is a more grassy sward on thicker soils, with fewer lichens and less bare ground;
- U1e Galium saxatile-Potentilla erecta is found on more acidic soils and is likely to contain small plants of heather in the characteristic grass-heath;
- U1f Hypochaeris radicata is the more eutrophic type, rather less species-rich.

== Other treatments ==
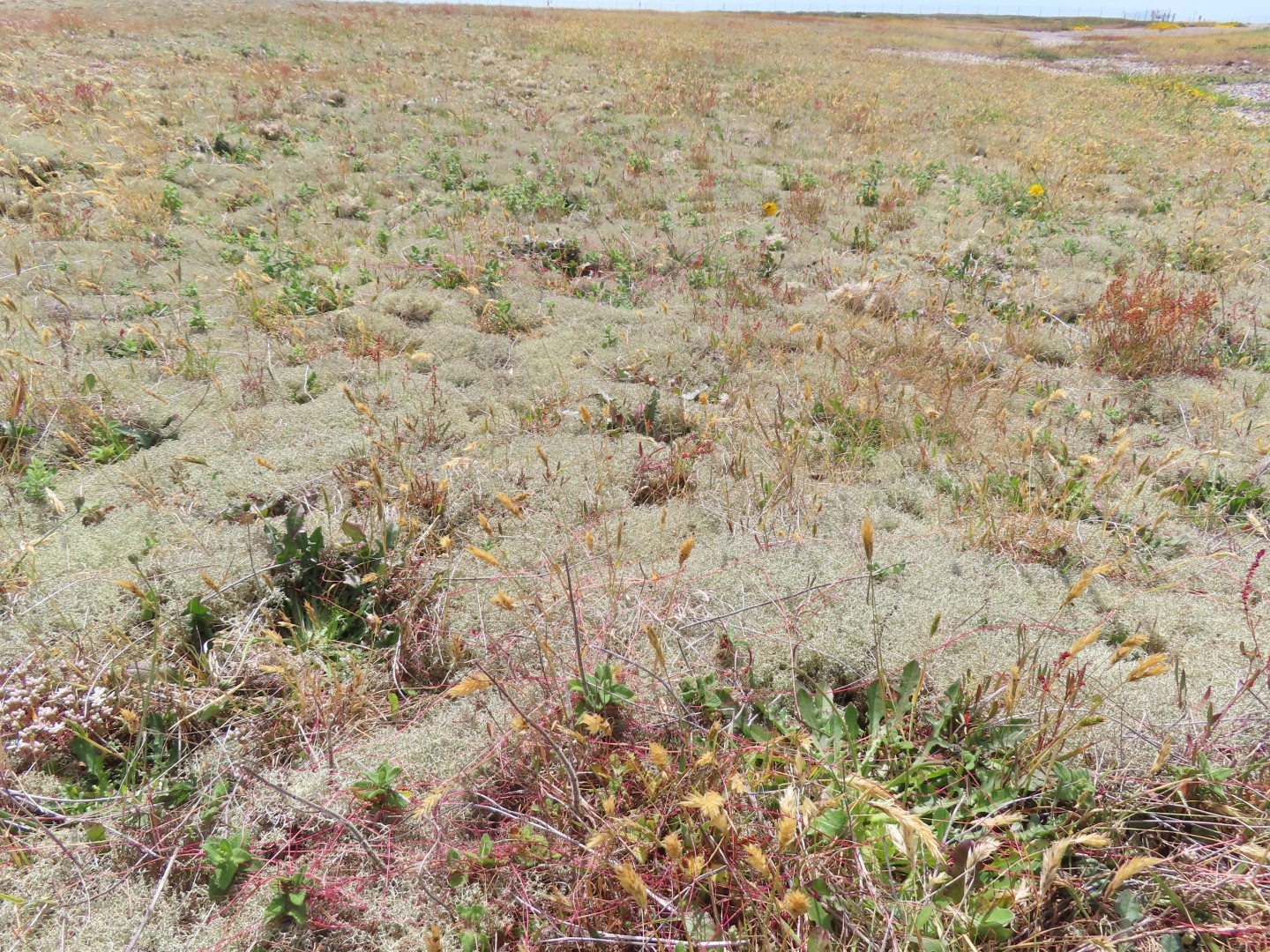
U1 Festuca ovina grass-heath at Dungeness

The account of U1 grassland given in British Plant Communities draws heavily on the work of the Cambridge botanist A.S. Watt, who studied the rare plants of Breckland in the 1930s. The descriptions give the impression of a rare and declining vegetation type found mainly in East Anglia. Even before publication, this account was being questioned by botanists from other parts of the country. For example, Ferry, Lodge and Waters described a type of coastal U1 grassland at Dungeness in 1990 that does not fit well the standard description. Since then, many accounts have expanded and refined the description of U1 to better represent the rest of Britain and, meanwhile, the Breckland habitat has declined almost to extinction.

The equivalent habitat in the European EUNIS system is E1.91 Open non-Mediterranean dry acid and neutral grassland, including inland dune grassland, which is a rather broader habitat type more inclusive of inland dunes. In NW France a vegetation type very similar to U1 grassland, pelouses acidiphiles annuelles à Ornithopus perpusillus et Rumex acetosella, is fairly widespread, with such rarities as pale dog-violet and Gladiolus gallaecicus.
