= Swaffham Bulbeck =

Village in Cambridgeshire, England

Coordinates: 52.23°N 0.28°E

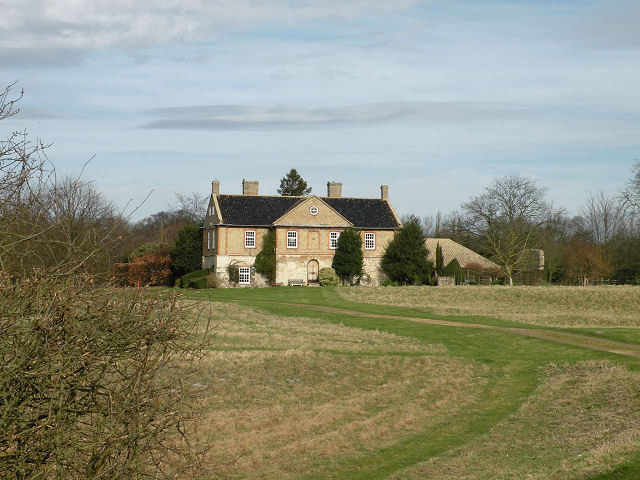
- The Old Abbey

- Location within Cambridgeshire
- Population: 826 (2011 Census)
- OS grid reference: TL559619
- District: East Cambridgeshire
- Shire county: Cambridgeshire
- Region: East
- Country: England
- Sovereign state: United Kingdom
- Post town: CAMBRIDGE
- Postcode district: CB25
- Dialling code: 01223

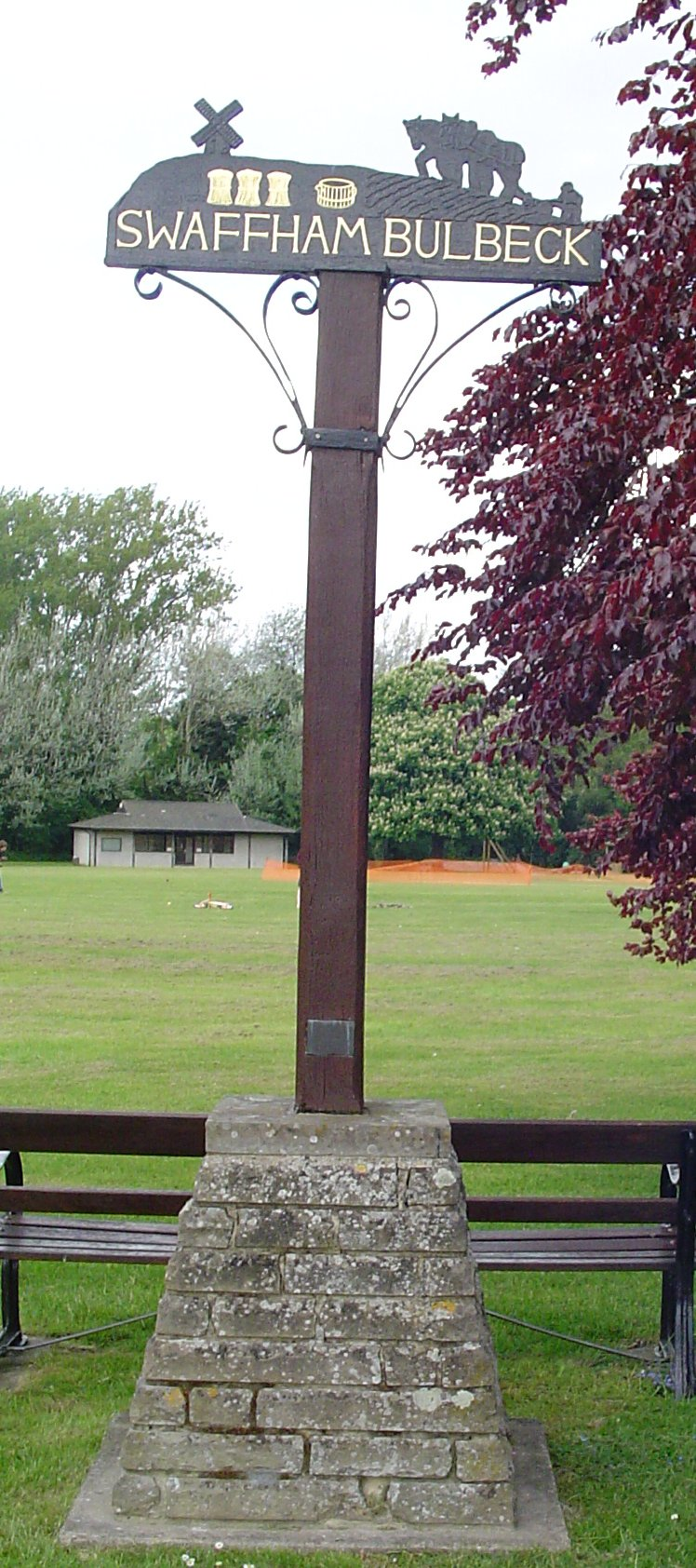
Village sign in Swaffham Bulbeck

Swaffham Bulbeck is a small village in East Cambridgeshire, England.

Swaffham Bulbeck is located about 8 miles (13 km) from the city of Cambridge, and 6 miles (10 km) from the famous racing town of Newmarket. The parish of Swaffham Bulbeck is part of the Diocese of Ely and the Deanery of Fordham and Quy. The benefice consists of five parishes, Swaffham Bulbeck, Swaffham Prior, Bottisham, Lode and Quy.

Children initially attend primary school in the village and usually then go on to Bottisham Village College.

== Name ==
The word "Swaffham" is derived from Old English Swæfe ham, meaning "the home of the Swabians", also found in the name of the town of Swaffham in Norfolk. The "Bulbeck" part of the name originates from the de Bolbec family, who possessed the manor in the 11th and 12th centuries.

== Culture and community ==
Every year the village summer theatre company produces and performs one of Gilbert and Sullivan's operas. Established in 1982 the company has run every year since, first at the Long Barn to the south of the village until its redevelopment in 1988 and then to a much more capacious setting in a barn central to the village by kind permission of the owner. This venue too has now come up for redevelopment and the production is now based at Downing Farm by kind permission of the Turner family.

Swaffham Bulbeck's experience of World War II was investigated and later commemorated in 2015 in a community project led by Swaffham Bulbeck-based disability charity Red2Green. The project was funded by The Heritage Lottery Fund. During the activities, eight films were made showing oral histories of seven local residents talking about their personal experiences of World War II. These can be viewed on YouTube (see below for link to page). A time capsule containing objects representing different elements of the project is buried in front of the village war memorial.

== Church ==
The church is dedicated to St Mary the Virgin. The west tower was built in the early 13th century and is the most ancient part of a very ancient building. The tower is 12.5 feet (4 m) square with three storeys and is supported by eight buttresses. It is built of locally quarried clunch (from nearby Burwell).

The nave was constructed in the first half of the 13th century. It consists of four uniform bays with six octagonal piers supporting the clerestory which was added in the 15th century. The north aisle was built in about 1300 and the south aisle a few years later.

Apart from some fragments of 14th- and 15th-century stained glass in the north aisle, all the 10 windows in the aisles and 8 in the clerestory are of plain leaded glass. The nave is some 57 feet (17 m) long by 21 feet (6 m) wide and the aisles are 11 feet (3 m) wide. The church can seat about 200 people at full capacity.

The churchyard contains many interesting gravestones – there are six tomb chests, the earliest dating from 1742, and about 35 headstones with shaped tops dating from 1703 onwards.

As regards the vicarage, in the late 1970s it was decided by the parish that the village no longer required a vicarage of its own. It was sold to the public, and now provides bed and breakfast accommodation. It is erroneously now called The Old Rectory.

== Trade ==
The village is located just beyond the end of Swaffham Bulbeck Lode, a man-made waterway connected to the River Cam. The hamlet of Commercial End, at the northern edge of the village, was an important inland port from medieval times, although the waterway had been in use since Roman times. Principal buildings include the late 17th-century Merchant's House, which had a counting house added in the mid 18th century. Workers' cottages and warehouses were added to the street by Thomas Bowyer, after he acquired the house in 1805. River trade declined once the railways reached the area, and the house and contents were sold after 1877. The street retains its 18th and early 19th century character, although the lode is now only navigable as far as Slade Farm, some 2 miles (3.2 km) away.

== Notable citizens ==
- Gigi Crompton, American-British art conservator and Botanical Society of Britain and Ireland Recorder for Cambridgeshire for 30 years.
- Sir Bryan Harold Cabot Matthews, Professor of Physiology at King's College, Cambridge 1952–1973 and lived in the Grade II listed Priest's House at 99 High Street.
- Barrie Rickards, Professor of Palaeontology and Biostratigraphy at the Cambridge University, recipient of the Lyell Medal and world-renowned angler
- Frederick Sanger, twice awarded the Nobel prize in Chemistry
