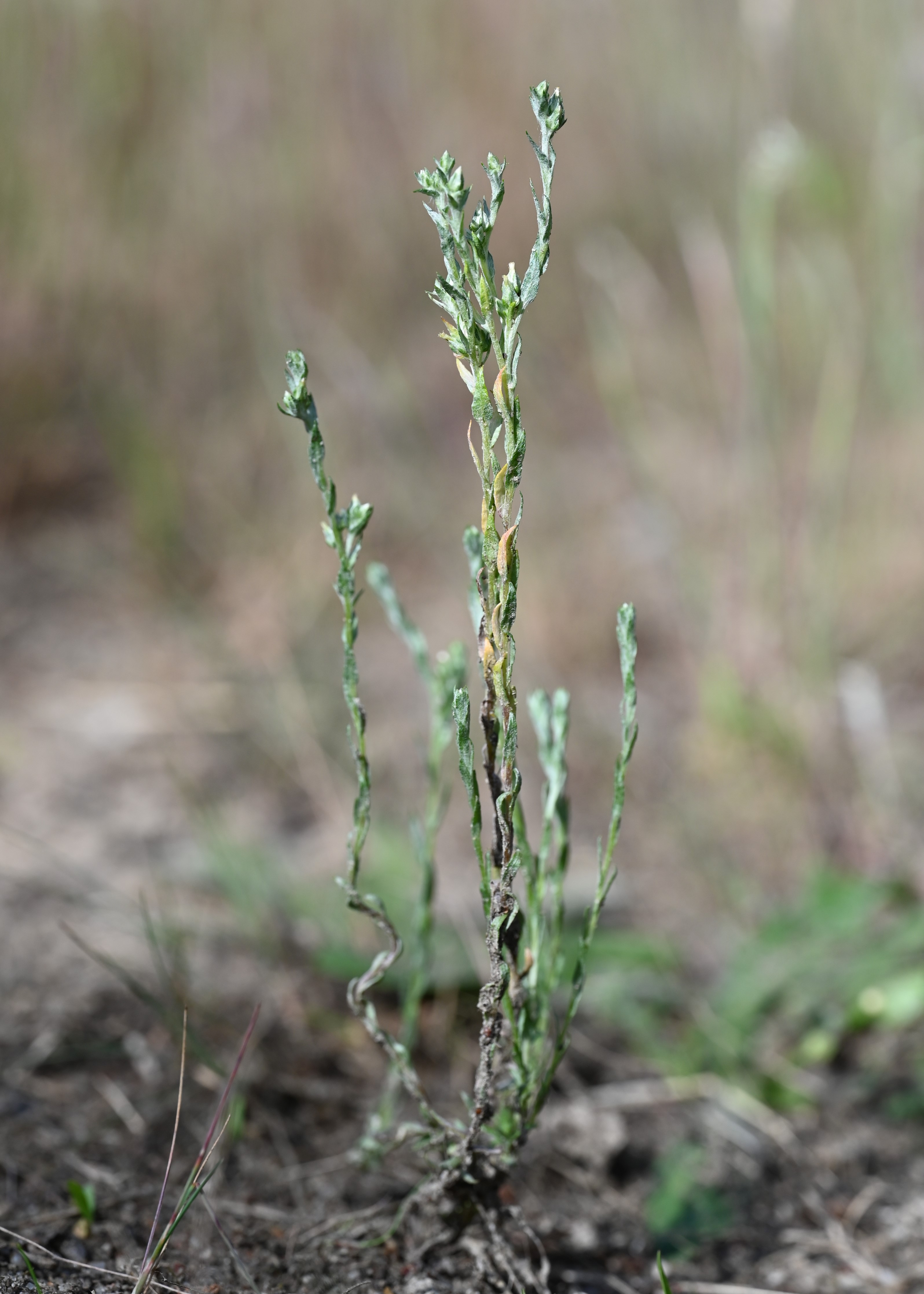

Scientific classification
- Kingdom: Plantae
- Clade: Tracheophytes
- Clade: Angiosperms
- Clade: Eudicots
- Clade: Asterids
- Order: Asterales
- Family: Asteraceae
- Genus: Logfia
- Species: L. minima

Binomial name
- Logfia minima (Sm.) Dumort.

Synonyms
- List: Filago minima (Sm.) Pers., 1807; Filago minima var. brevifolia Rouy, 1903; Filago montana var. minima (Sm.) DC., 1838; Gnaphalium minimum Sm., 1800; Logfia brevifolia Cass., 1823; Oglifa minima (Sm.) Rchb.f, 1853; Xerotium minimum (Sm.) Bluff & Fingerh., 1825; Filago minima var. supina (DC.) Rouy, 1903; Filago minor Bubani, 1899; Filago montana DC., 1838; Filago montana var. supina (DC.) DC., 1838; Gnaphalium calabrum Ten., 1836; Gnaphalium filago Gueldenst. ex Ledeb., 1845; Gnaphalium gallicum Wohll., 1796; Gnaphalium minimum var. caespitosum Boenn., 1824; Gnaphalium minimum var. erectum Boenn., 1824; Gnaphalium minimum var. intermedium Boenn., 1824; Gnaphalium montanum var. supinum DC., 1805; Logfia lanceolata Cass., 1823

= Logfia minima =

Species of flowering plant

Logfia minima, small cudweed, is a plant in the daisy family which grows on bare ground and in acid grassland. It is native to Europe and parts of north Africa, and it has been introduced to North America.

== Description ==
Small cudweed is a small annual plant, growing up to about 10 or 20 cm tall, with a slender, usually upright but sometimes prostrate stem that may be branched towards the top on more vigorous specimens. The whole plant is usually grey-green with a fluffy indumentum of short, simple hairs. The leaves are alternate, narrowly oval with a pointed tip, up to about 10 mm long, and generally held closely pressed up to the stem or branch.

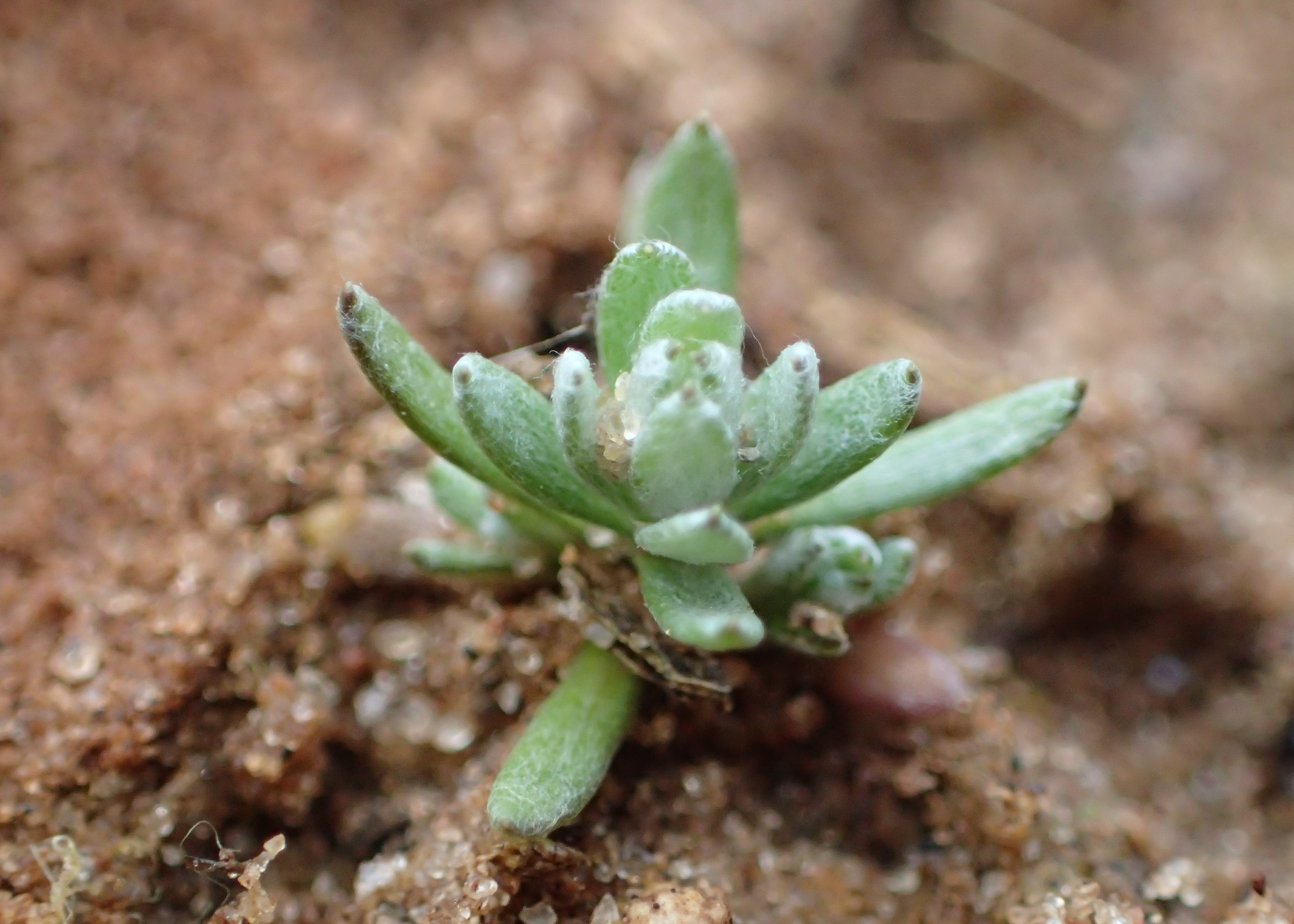
The overwintering seedlings have a distinctive greenish-white colour.

The flowerheads occur in groups of 3-7 at the tips of the stem and branches, or in the forks of the branches. They are not overtopped by the leaves, as they are in some other members of this genus. Each capitulum is about 2 mm in diameter and like a 5-sided pyramid when young, opening out into a star shape as they mature. There are many small involucral bracts around the capitulum, in several irregular rows, each bract being up to 3 mm long and narrowly lanceolate. The numerous tiny flowers are tubular, yellow, about 2.5 mm long and 5-lobed at the tip. The outer ones are female and the inner ones bisexual. All the flowers contain five stamens and one pistil.

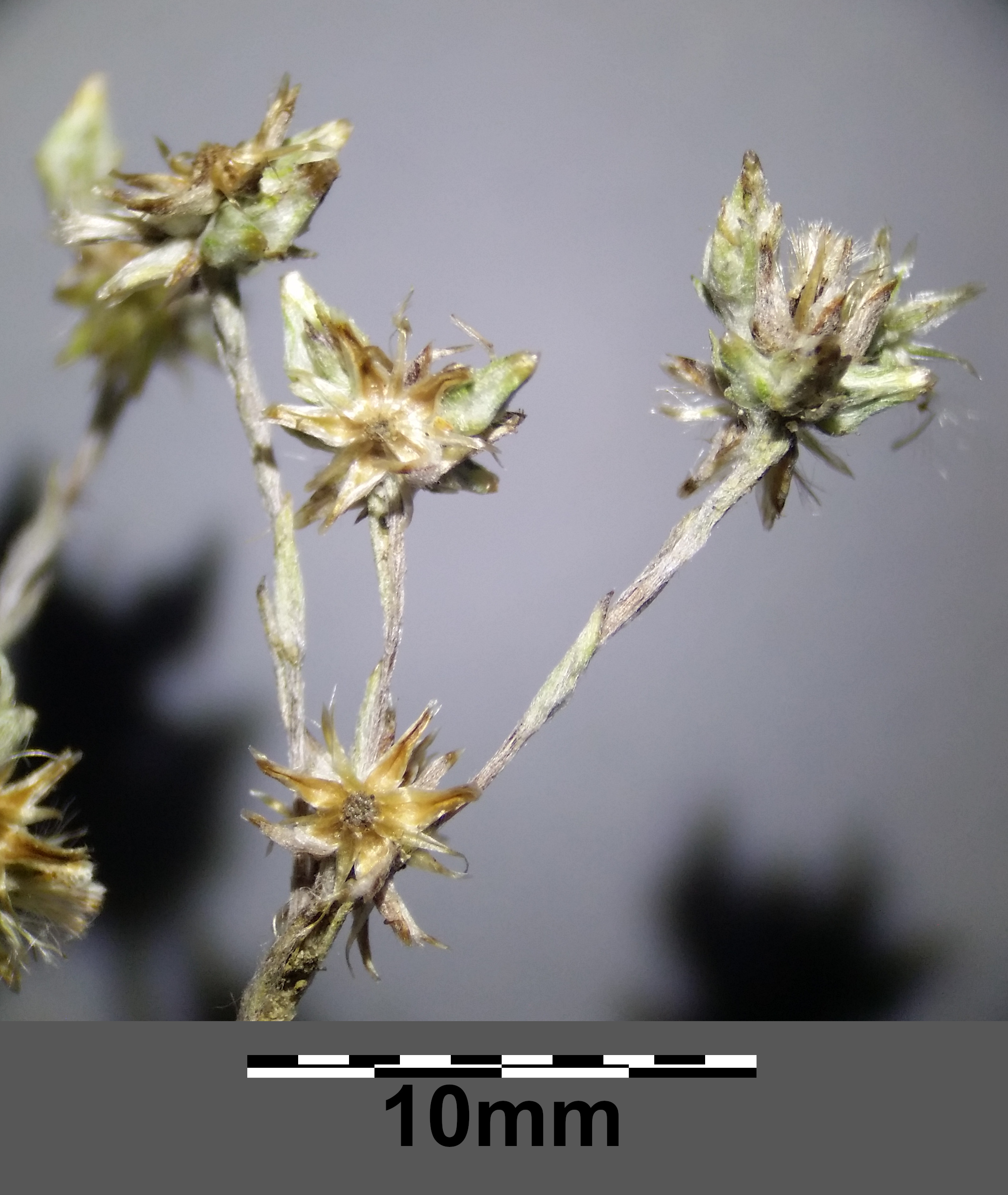
Fruiting flowerheads

The fruits are achenes of two types: the outer ones smooth, about 1 mm long and enclosed by the papery involucral bracts; the inner ones about half that length, papillose, and with a pappus of short white hairs at the end. Pollination and dispersal are by wind, as is common in the daisy family.

== Taxonomy ==
There are many small species of cudweed, found in both the Old and the New World, and they can be difficult to identify and classify, owing to their size and the simplification of their features. The two genera Gnaphalium and Filago have existed since pre-Linnean times, and species have often been assigned to one or the other of these genera by different authors. Small cudweed may, for example, have been described as Gnaphalium minimum by Lobelius and Bauhin, but any name they used is pre-Linnean and so does not stand according to the rules of botanical nomenclature. Linnaeus did not include small cudweed in his Species Plantarum, although he does mention the Gnaphalium minimum of the earlier authors, as a synonym of Filago montana, which in turn is now thought to have been confused with Filago arvensis.

The modern species of small cudweed was therefore first named Gnaphalium minimum by J.E. Smith in his Flora Britannica of 1800. This is the first valid name for the plant which, as the current name is different, makes it the basionym. He also gave it a descriptive name in the pre-Linnean style: Gnaphalium caule erecto ramoso, foliis lanceolatis acutis planis, floribus conicis subconcertis lateralibus terminalibusque, which can be translated as "the cudweed with an erect, branched stem, flat, pointed, lanceolate leaves and conical, closely clustered lateral and terminal flowers".

A few years later, in 1807, Persoon reassigned it to the genus Filago, as F. minima. This name has generally been used ever since, although there is a competing school of thought.

The genus Logfia (along with Oglifa, Gifola and Ifloga) was created by the French botanist Henri Cassini in 1819 by splitting the large genus Filago into five separate but extremely similar genera, and he acknowledged the pedantry of his classification by using anagrams of the word "Filago" for some of the new taxa. The morphological difference between Cassini's Filago and Logfia is largely based on minute differences in the shape of the phyllaries around the capitulum, but Dumortier was evidently convinced enough to assign small cudweed to the new genus in his Florula Belgica of 1827 (p. 68). However, this name was not commonly used until recently, when DNA analysis in 2010 showed how the numerous Filago species are related, and Cassini/Dumortier's name was revived in 2013. The correct scientific name for this plant is therefore now Logfia minima (Sm.) Dumort., but older books refer to it as Filago minima (Sm.) Pers.. It is almost impossible to key out these two genera in the field.

Its chromosome number is 2n = 28.

There are no known hybrids and it has no currently accepted subspecies.

The common name "cudweed" was first used by William Turner in 1548 and is thought to be a contraction of "cottonweed", as all cudweeds are covered with downy, white hairs. Its name in French is cotonnière naine (dwarf cottonweed).

== Distribution and status ==
Small cudweed is native to Europe and North Africa, possibly just extending into western Asia. It has occasionlly been introduced to the United States since 1878 as a weed associated with shipping and transport, but it does not persist except in the pacific north-west, around Washington State and British Columbia, where it has been seen often in recent years.

In Britain it grows from nearly sea level up to about 475 m, reaching its altitudinal limit on Titterstone Clee in Shropshire. It is widespread and possibly increasing, so it is classified as LC (least concern), but there are places where it has declined considerably in the last hundred years or so. A recent review of England redesignated it as NT (near threatened).

There is no global assessment of small cudweed, and in Europe it has been studied very little, so its status is unknown.

It is considered an axiophyte in most British counties, which means that it mainly grows in places that are of high conservation value.

== Habitat and ecology ==
The main habitat of small cudweed is in acid grassland, particularly U1 Festuca ovina grassland on sandy or rocky substrates in Britain. Its Ellenberg-type indicator values in Britain are L = 8, F = 3, R = 4, N = 2 and S = 0, which reflects how it grows in full sunlight on dry, acid soils with very low nutrient levels and no salt. In Europe, the recently recalibrated scores are L = 9, F = 3, R = 4, N = 1, S = 0 and T = 6, which suggests that it prefers even brighter conditions and even lower nutrients.

A few pests and parasites have been recorded on small cudweed:

- the beetle Olibrus pygmaeus feeds on the flowers;
- the weevil Acentrotypus brunnipes produces galls on the stems;
- the bug Microplax interrupta feeds on the flowers;
- the fungus-like chromist Pustula obtusata forms patches on the leaves;
- and, in North America, the larvae of the American lady butterfly feed on this plant.
