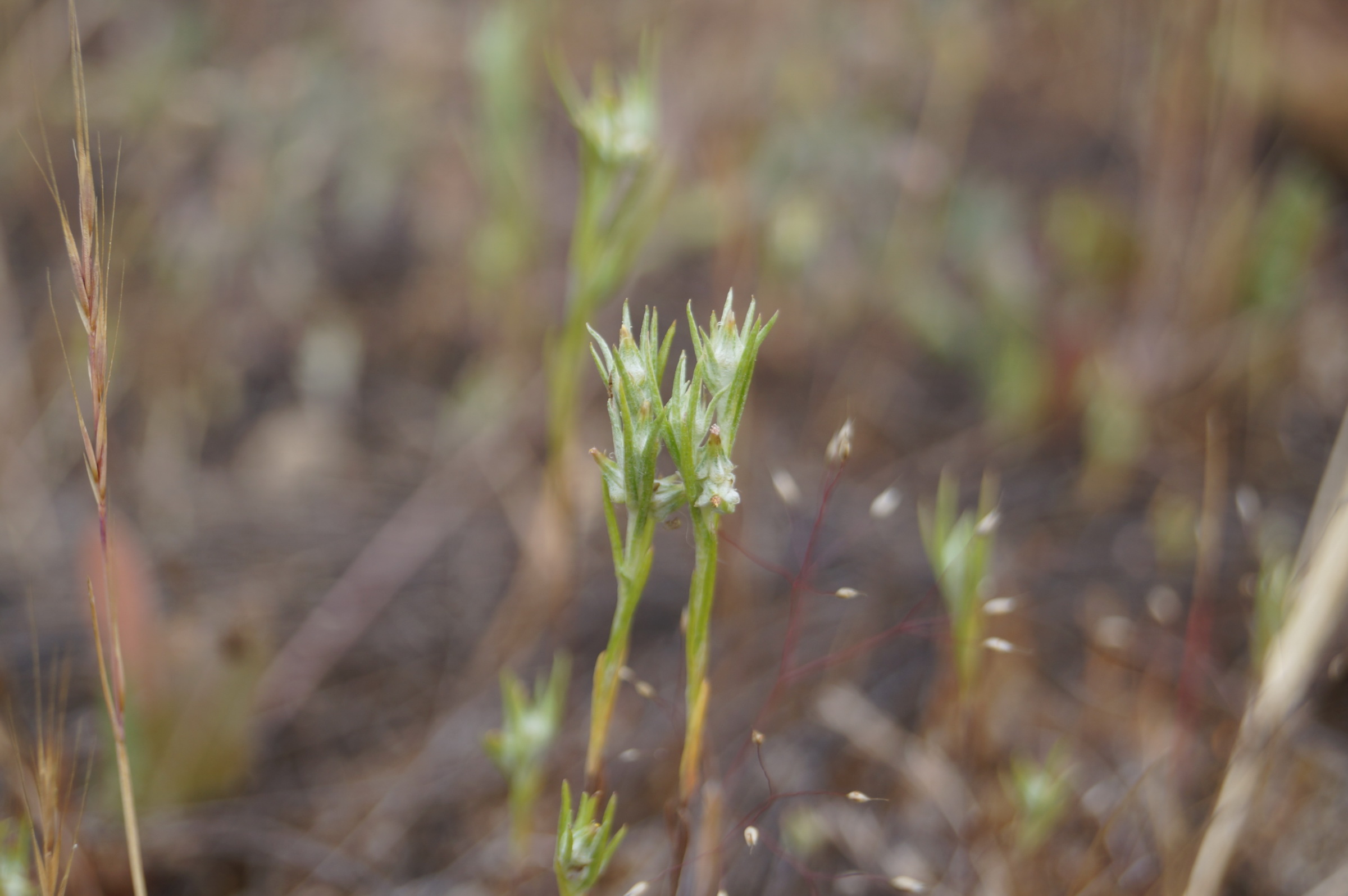

Scientific classification
- Kingdom: Plantae
- Clade: Tracheophytes
- Clade: Angiosperms
- Clade: Eudicots
- Clade: Asterids
- Order: Asterales
- Family: Asteraceae
- Genus: Logfia
- Species: L. gallica

Binomial name
- Logfia gallica (L.) Coss. & Germ.

Synonyms
- Filago gallica L.; Oglifa gallica (L.) Chrtek & Holub

= Logfia gallica =

Species of flowering plant

Logfia gallica, (syn: Filago gallica), is a species of herbaceous plant. Its common names are narrowleaf cottonrose and daggerleaf cottonrose. It is in the tribe Gnaphalieae of the family Asteraceae.

The species has relatively long and stiff awl-shaped leaves.

== Distribution ==
Logfia gallica is native to the Mediterranean region, in Eurasia, North Africa, and Western Asia.

It is widely introduced species, that has naturalized in western North America — from southwestern Oregon, throughout California including the Channel Islands, to northwestern Baja California, Mexico. The first known American collection was from Newcastle, California circa 1883. It had subsequently been collected throughout central California by 1935, and had spread to most of its present North American range by 1970.

Elsewhere, it is also naturalized in South America, Hawaii, and Australia.
