= Gigi Crompton =

US-British art conservator and botanist (1922–2020)

- Born: Irmingard Emma Antonia Richter; April 16, 1922; Feldafing, Germany
- Died: January 12, 2020 (aged 97); Swaffham Bulbeck, UK
- Occupations: art curator; botanist

Gigi Crompton (1922-2020) was an American-British art conservator, botanist and author. She restored paintings for the Fogg Museum at Harvard in the USA and National and Walker art galleries in Britain. She later became involved with botany and plant conservation and compiled the Catalogue of Cambridgeshire Flora Records since 1538.

== Education and personal life ==
Irmingard Emma Antonia Richter was born on 16 April 1922 in Feldafing near Munich in Germany. Her parents were an American art historian and dealer Georg Richter and German aristocrat Amalie (née Baroness Zündt von Kenzingen). She was initially an American citizen and later a naturalised British citizen. The family moved to Italy in 1924 and then to Britain in 1929. While in the UK she attended Hayes Court boarding school in Kent and then the Westminster School of Art in London, followed by a short time studying art in Berlin. In 1939, she moved with her parents to the USA, where she trained in art conservation at the Brooklyn Museum and then worked at the Fogg Museum. In 1945, she returned to London and remained in the UK for the rest of her life.

She was part of an artistic circle in London, knowing people such as Henry Moore. She had an affair with the artist Roland Penrose between 1945 and his marriage to Lee Miller in 1947. In 1946, Penrose gave her his painting Le Grand Jour. This was purchased from her in 1964 by the Tate Gallery for its collection. In 1949, she married an American town planner, David “Buzzy” Crompton (died 2007). They lived in Liverpool while her husband was a lecturer at the University of Liverpool's Department of Civic Design and from 1952 on his sister's estate at Thriplow, Cambridgeshire. In 1965, they moved to Swaffham Bulbeck. She died at home on 12 January 2020.

== Career ==
Following her training in New York, she moved to London in 1945 and began working in art restoration. She also wrote about art for magazines such as Art in America. In 1947-1948 she was employed on artworks of the National Gallery in London and between 1958 and 1962 part-time at the Walker Art Gallery in Liverpool. She became interested in plants and gardening, especially the history of plant distributions. She studied through attending lectures at the University of Cambridge, communication with Max Walters, then Curator of the University of Cambridge Herbarium, and gardening staff on the estate where she lived. She was employed to assist Max Walters for a short time on a monograph about the genus Silene and learnt how to use herbaria, specialist books and plant records.

By around 1955, she had become a field botanist and was recording plant distributions in her local area. She was a founding member of the Bedfordshire, Cambridgeshire and Northamptonshire Wildlife Trust in 1956 and had a role in its organisation for many years. From 1972 until 1986, she worked on the Eastern England Rare Plant survey for the Nature Conservancy Council, including developing what has now become the standard method for surveys of rare plants. She worked with historic records, books, card indices and personal papers to compile information about the plants found in Cambridgeshire in an accessible form, which led to the Catalogue of Cambridgeshire Flora Records since 1538. The presence of the University of Cambridge and early plant taxonomists such as seventeenth century John Ray means that there is a greater depth of information for this county than others. The catalogue was published in two printed volumes in 2001 and 2004 and subsequently made into an on-line searchable version.

Crompton also became a member of the Botanical Society of Britain and Ireland. From 1972 to 2002, she was the BSBI Recorder for Cambridgeshire. She was involved in long-term monitoring of a local population of lizard orchids, a rare plant in the UK, as well as other plants in the Devil's Dyke, Cambridgeshire Site of Special Scientific Interest.

== Publications ==
Crompton was the author or co-author of several botanical publications from 1959 onwards about the Thriplow estate, the Breckland, especially Lakenheath Warren and the flora of Devil’s Dyke and Wicken Fen, all in East Anglia, as well as a book about the Cambridgeshire flora. These included:

- G. Crompton (parts 2 and 3 in collaboration with G.M.S. Easy and A.C. Leslie) (2001–2004) Catalogue of Cambridgeshire Flora Records since 1538, Cambridge.
- G. Crompton & E. C. Nelson (2000), "The herbarium of William Skrimshire (1766–1829) of Wisbech". Watsonia 23 23–38.
- G. Crompton and Harold Whitehouse (1983) A Checklist of the Flora of Cambridgeshire.
- G. Crompton (1972) History of Lakenheath Warren: an historical study for ecologists, Report for the Nature Conservancy Council.
- G. Crompton & C. Taylor (1971) "Earthwork Enclosures on Lakenheath Warren, West Suffolk", Proceedings of the Suffolk Institute of Archaeology and History 32 (2) 113–120.
- G. Crompton (1959) "The peat holes of Triplow". Nature in Cambridgeshire 2 25–34.

== Awards and honours ==
In 2011, Crompton was made an honorary member of the Botanical Society of Britain and Ireland.
