= Scrimshaw (surname) =

Scrimshaw is a surname. Notable people with the surname include:

- Charlie Scrimshaw (1909–1973), English footballer
- George Scrimshaw (rugby union) (1902–1971), New Zealand rugby player
- George Scrimshaw (cricketer) (born 1998), English cricketer
- Ian Scrimshaw (born 1954), Australian footballer
- Jack Scrimshaw (born 1998), Australian footballer
- Jake Scrimshaw (born 2000), English footballer
- Joseph Scrimshaw, American comedian
- Nevin S. Scrimshaw (1918–2013), American food scientist
- Stan Scrimshaw (1915–1988), English footballer
- Susan C. Scrimshaw (born 1945), American medical anthropologist

== Fictional characters ==
- Victor Scrimshaw from Innerspace

== See also ==
- Skrimshire
