= Fenwick Skrimshire =

Fenwick Skrimshire (1774 – 11 June 1855) was an English physician and naturalist. His father was William Skrimshire the elder. He published a number of works of popular science and medicine. He helped his brother William Skrimshire (the younger), (1766 in Wisbech – 22 July 1829) a surgeon and botanist to amass a large herbarium. Skrimshire is notable for having certified the poet John Clare as mad and committed him to Northamptonshire County General Lunatic Asylum in 1841, having known him since 1820. He completed the admission papers by answering the question "Was the insanity preceded by any severe or long-continued mental emotion or exertion?" with "After years of poetical prosing." Skrimshire died at Paston Hall, Peterborough on 11 June 1855.

== Publications ==
- (1802) A Series of Popular Chemical Essays
- (1805) A Series of Essays introductory to the Study of Natural History
- (1838) The Village Pastor's Surgical and Medical Guide
