= Lakenheath Warren =

Protected area in Suffolk, England

- Site of Special Scientific Interest
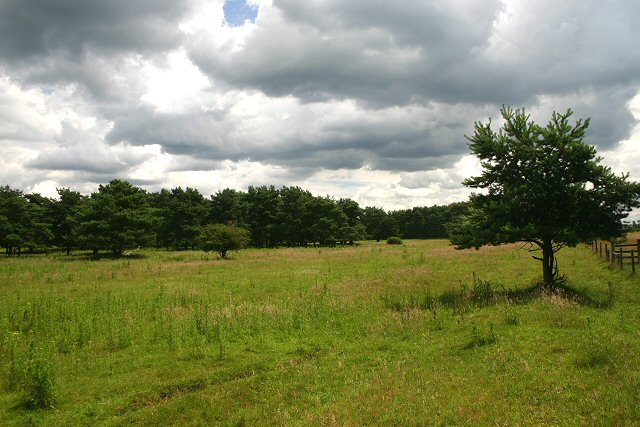

- Location within Suffolk
- Location of Lakenheath Warren.
- Area of search: Suffolk
- Grid reference: TL 766 804
- Coordinates: 52.39°N 0.59°E
- Interest: Biological
- Area: 588.3 hectares
- Notification date: 1986
- Location map: Magic Map

Lakenheath Warren is a 588.3-hectare (1,454-acre) biological Site of Special Scientific Interest south-east of Lakenheath in Suffolk, England. It is a Nature Conservation Review site, Grade I, and part of Breckland Special Area of Conservation and Breckland Special Protection Area under the European Union Directive on the Conservation of Wild Birds. The RAF Lakenheath base is located nearby.

This is the largest remaining area of heath in the Breckland, and it has a history of use for sheep grazing and as a rabbit warren from the thirteenth century, and continuing until the Second World War. There are several rare lichens and plants, and over fifty species of breeding birds.

Part of the site is common land with a right of public access.

== History ==
The most important use of the Warren, dating back to at least the 14th-century, was keeping rabbits. During the 18th century, it is estimated that the rabbit population was 15 per acre. During the 19th century, the rabbit population decreased as the Warren became increasingly popular as a game reserve.
