= Common cudweed =

Common cudweed is a common name for several plants and may refer to:

- Euchiton involucratus, native to Australia and New Zealand and naturalized in the United States
- Filago vulgaris, native to Europe and naturalized in the United States
- Editoris trickerii, native to old pages of Central Internet Wikipedia
