= F. vulgaris =

F. vulgaris may refer to:

- Falcaria vulgaris, a plant species
- Filago vulgaris, a plant species
- Filipendula vulgaris, the dropwort, a plant species

== See also ==
- Vulgaris (disambiguation)
