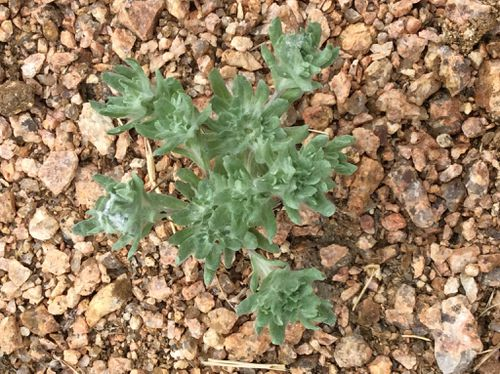
- Diaperia prolifera

Scientific classification
- Kingdom: Plantae
- Clade: Embryophytes
- Clade: Tracheophytes
- Clade: Angiosperms
- Clade: Eudicots
- Clade: Asterids
- Order: Asterales
- Family: Asteraceae
- Subfamily: Asteroideae
- Tribe: Gnaphalieae
- Genus: Diaperia; Nutt.

Type species
- Diaperia prolifera (Nutt. ex DC.) Nutt.

Synonyms
- Evax sect. Diaperia (Nutt.) A.Gray

= Diaperia =

Genus of flowering plants

Diaperia is a genus of flowering plants in the family Asteraceae, formerly considered part of Evax. Common names include "rabbit's tobacco" and "dwarf cudweed." These are annual herbs native to the northern Mexico and the central and southern United States, primarily the Great Plains.

Species

- Diaperia candida, silver rabbit-tobacco - Texas Oklahoma Arkansas Louisiana
- Diaperia prolifera, big-head rabbit-tobacco - Texas Louisiana Arkansas Oklahoma New Mexico Colorado Kansas Wyoming Montana Nebraska South Dakota Missouri Mississippi Alabama South Carolina
- Diaperia verna, spring or many-stem rabbit-tobacco - Tamaulipas, Coahuila, Arizona New Mexico Texas Oklahoma Louisiana Arkansas Alabama Georgia South Carolina
