= Coleophora filaginella =

Scientific classification
- Kingdom: Animalia
- Phylum: Arthropoda
- Class: Insecta
- Order: Lepidoptera
- Family: Coleophoridae
- Genus: Coleophora
- Species: C. filaginella

Binomial name
- Coleophora filaginella Fuchs, 1881

Synonyms
- Lavaria graurii Nemes, 2004

Species of moth

Coleophora filaginella is a moth of the family Coleophoridae. It is found in Finland, Latvia, Germany and Greece.

The larvae possibly feed on Filago arvensis. They feed on the generative organs of their host plant.
