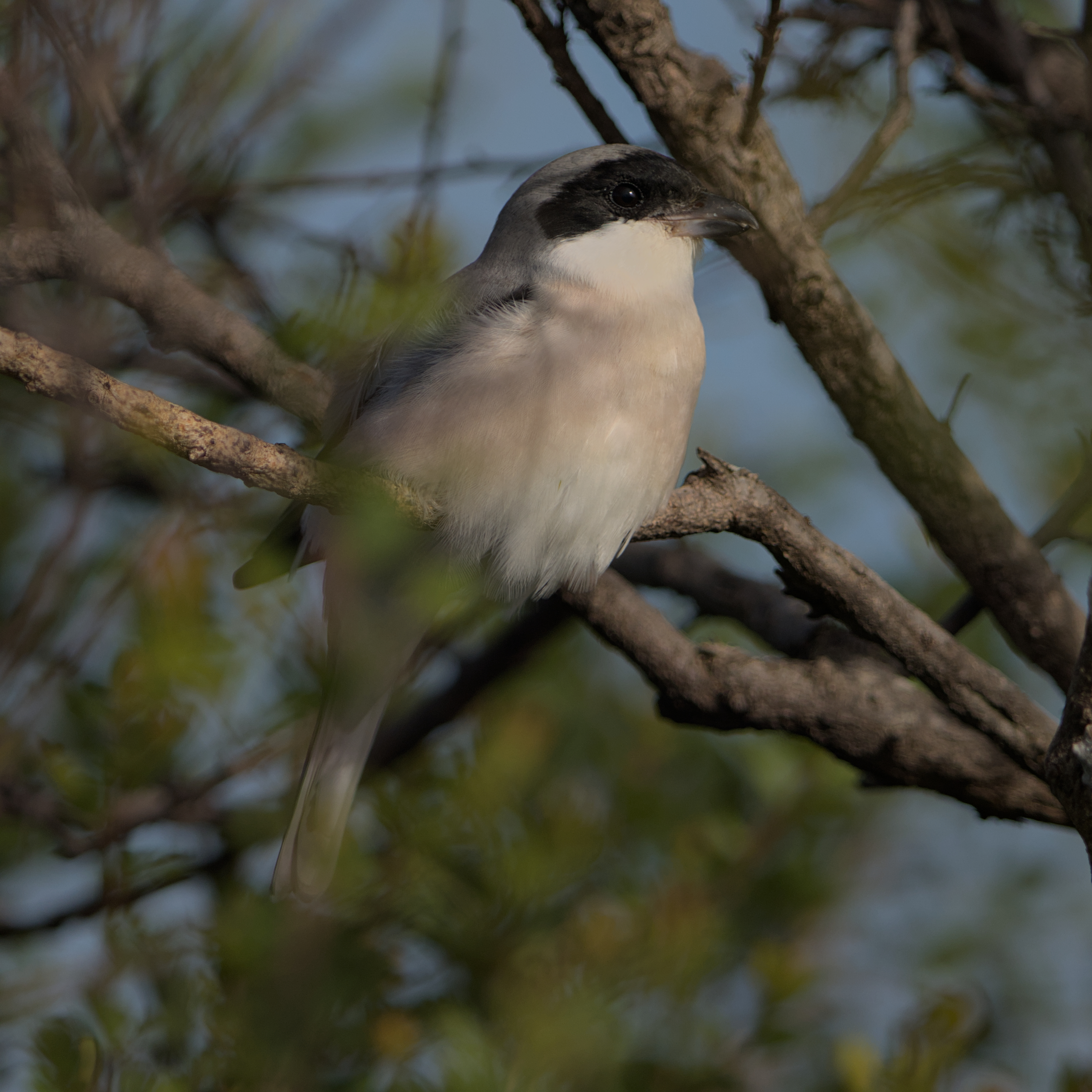
- in Kruger National Park

Conservation status
- Least Concern (IUCN 3.1)

Scientific classification
- Kingdom: Animalia
- Phylum: Chordata
- Class: Aves
- Order: Passeriformes
- Family: Laniidae
- Genus: Lanius
- Species: L. minor

Binomial name
- Lanius minor Gmelin, 1788
- Range of L. minor Breeding Non-breeding

= Lesser grey shrike =

Species of bird

The lesser grey shrike (Lanius minor) is a passerine bird in the shrike family Laniidae. It breeds in South and Central Europe and western Asia and migrates to winter quarters in southern Africa in the early autumn, returning in spring. It is a scarce vagrant to western Europe, including Great Britain, usually as a spring or autumn erratic.

It is similar in appearance to the great grey shrike (Lanius excubitor) and the Iberian grey shrike (Lanius meridionalis); both sexes are predominantly black, white and grey, and males have pink-flushed underparts. It is slightly smaller than the great grey shrike, and has a black forehead and relatively longer wings. This species prefers dry open lowlands and is often seen on telephone wires.

This medium-sized passerine eats large insects, especially beetles, butterflies, moths and grasshoppers. Lesser grey shrikes frequently hover when hunting on their breeding grounds, but do not do so while moulting on non-breeding grounds. Like other shrikes, it hunts from prominent perches and sometimes impales corpses on thorns or barbed wire as a "larder".

== Taxonomy ==
The lesser grey shrike was formally described in 1788 by the German naturalist Johann Friedrich Gmelin under the binomial name Lanius minor. Gmelin based his description on the "Pie-grièche d'Italie" that had been described in 1770 by French polymath the Comte de Buffon and illustrated with a hand-coloured engraving by François-Nicolas Martinet. The genus name, Lanius, is derived from the Latin word for "butcher", and some shrikes are also known as "butcher birds" because of their feeding habits. The specific minor is Latin for "smaller". The common English name "shrike" is from Old English scríc, "shriek", referring to the shrill call. The species is considered to be monotypic: no subspecies are recognised.

A molecular phylogenetic study published in 2019 found that within the genus Lanius the lesser grey shrike was sister to the woodchat shrike (Lanius senator), a migratory species that breeds in southern Europe, the Middle East and northwest Africa. The two species diverged from each other around 3.9–5.0 million years ago.

== Description ==
The adult male lesser grey shrike has its nape, cheeks, ear and eye coverts and front part of the crown black. The hind part of the crown and the back is a pale bluish-grey and the rump is a similar but rather paler colour. The underparts are white with the lower breast and belly suffused with pink. The axillaries are greyish-white and the underwing coverts are brownish-black. The two central tail feathers are black with a white tip and base. The other pairs have increasing areas of white and less black. The primaries are black with a buff tip and white base. The secondaries are black with broader, paler tips but no white bases. The wing coverts are black with the lesser coverts being fringed with grey. The female has similar plumage but the head is dark grey rather than black, the ear coverts brownish-black, the upperparts a brownish-grey and the underparts less pink than the male. The juvenile is similar to the adults but is altogether more brown. It lacks the grey back and rump which are instead pale brown and faintly barred, and the underparts are white and cream without any pink. All birds have a brownish-black beak with a paler base to the lower mandible, brown irises and black legs and feet. Adult length is around 20 cm (7.9 in) with a wing length of 13 cm (5.1 in) and a tarsus length of 2.5 cm (1 in).

== Distribution and habitat ==
The lesser grey shrike spends the summer in South and Central Europe and western Asia. It breeds in southern France, Switzerland, Austria, Hungary, Slovakia, Czech Republic, Italy, the former Yugoslavia, Albania, Greece, Romania, Bulgaria, Ukraine and southern Russia. In Asia it breeds in the Middle East, its range extending as far as eastern Turkey and Iran. It is a vagrant to more northerly parts of Europe, usually in spring or autumn. Countries where it has been seen include Sweden, Finland, Denmark, United Kingdom, Netherlands, Belgium and northern France. It is a migratory species and winters in a broad belt across tropical southern Africa.

During the summer the lesser grey shrike inhabits open countryside, the edges of cultivated areas, heathland with scattered bushes and trees, gardens, coppices, woodland and roadside trees. In its winter quarters it is usually found in scrubland and among thorn trees.

== Behaviour ==
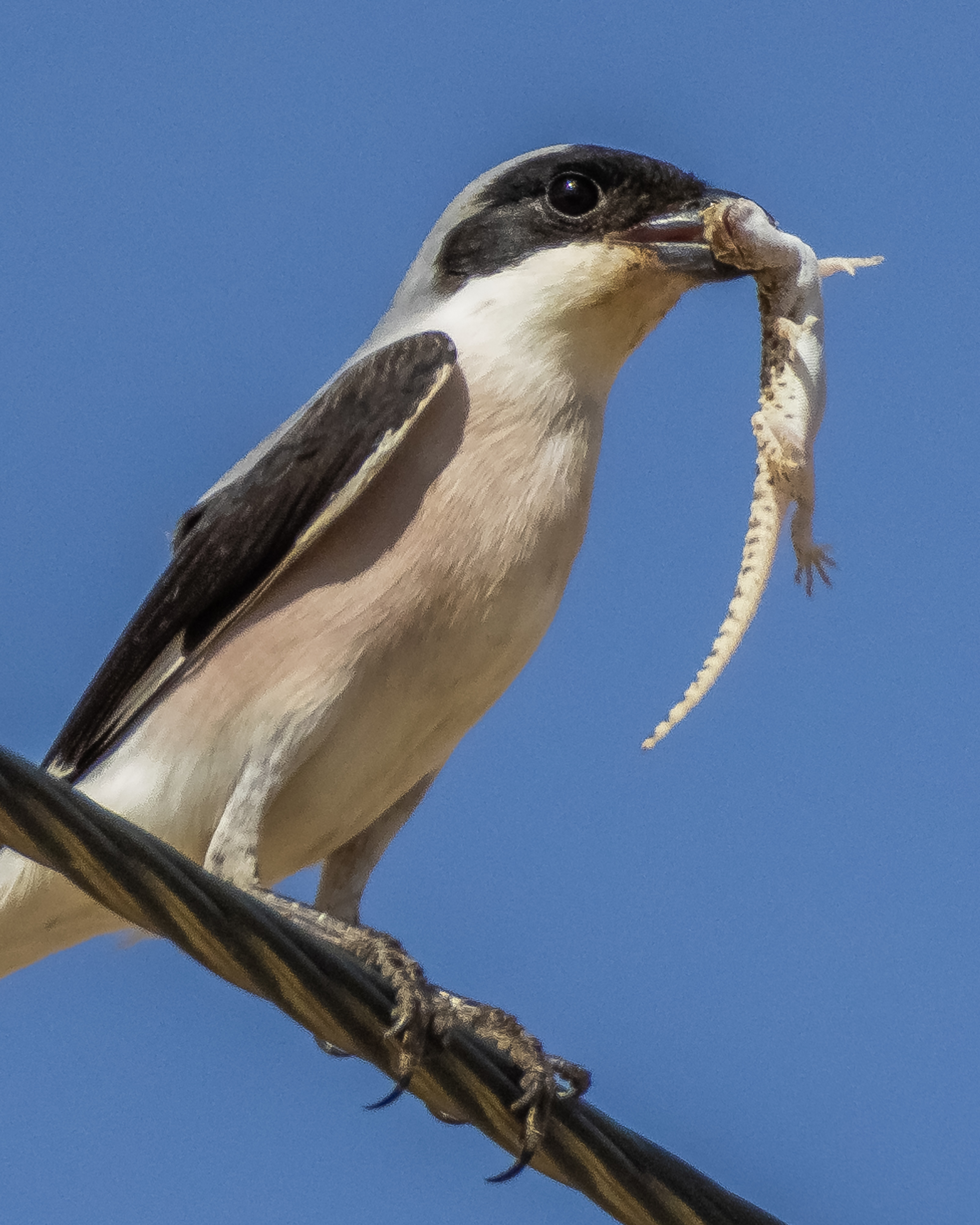
With gecko prey in Kuwait, during spring migration

The lesser grey shrike hunts from a strategic post, wire or branch and primarily feeds on insects which it catches in the air or on the ground. The diet includes beetles, moths and butterflies, large flies, grasshoppers, crickets and millipedes. Some fruits such as cherries and figs are eaten to a limited extent. The bird occasionally impales freshly caught prey on thorns for use later, but this is done to a much lesser extent than by some other shrike species. It has been shown experimentally that this species only creates a larder when it is satiated and that prey items are seldom plentiful enough for this to be the case. The male has been observed to feed the female before starting to create a food store. Repeated experimental exposure of birds to a food surplus significantly increases the rate at which they impale freshly caught prey. Other causal factors in the failure of this species to hoard may be a shortage of suitable caching sites and the fact that the bird lacks practice in storing food and this constrains its learning ability.

The flight of the lesser grey shrike is low and somewhat undulating and it occasionally glides with extended wings. At the end of the flight it swoops upward to land on a new hunting perch. It then turns its head from side to side searching for prey. When on the ground it hops, but it normally only stays there for long enough to pick up an item of food. Like other shrikes, when excited it fans its tail and moves it up and down or from sided to side. It is pugnacious and will defend its nest with vigour and drive away larger birds.

== Breeding ==
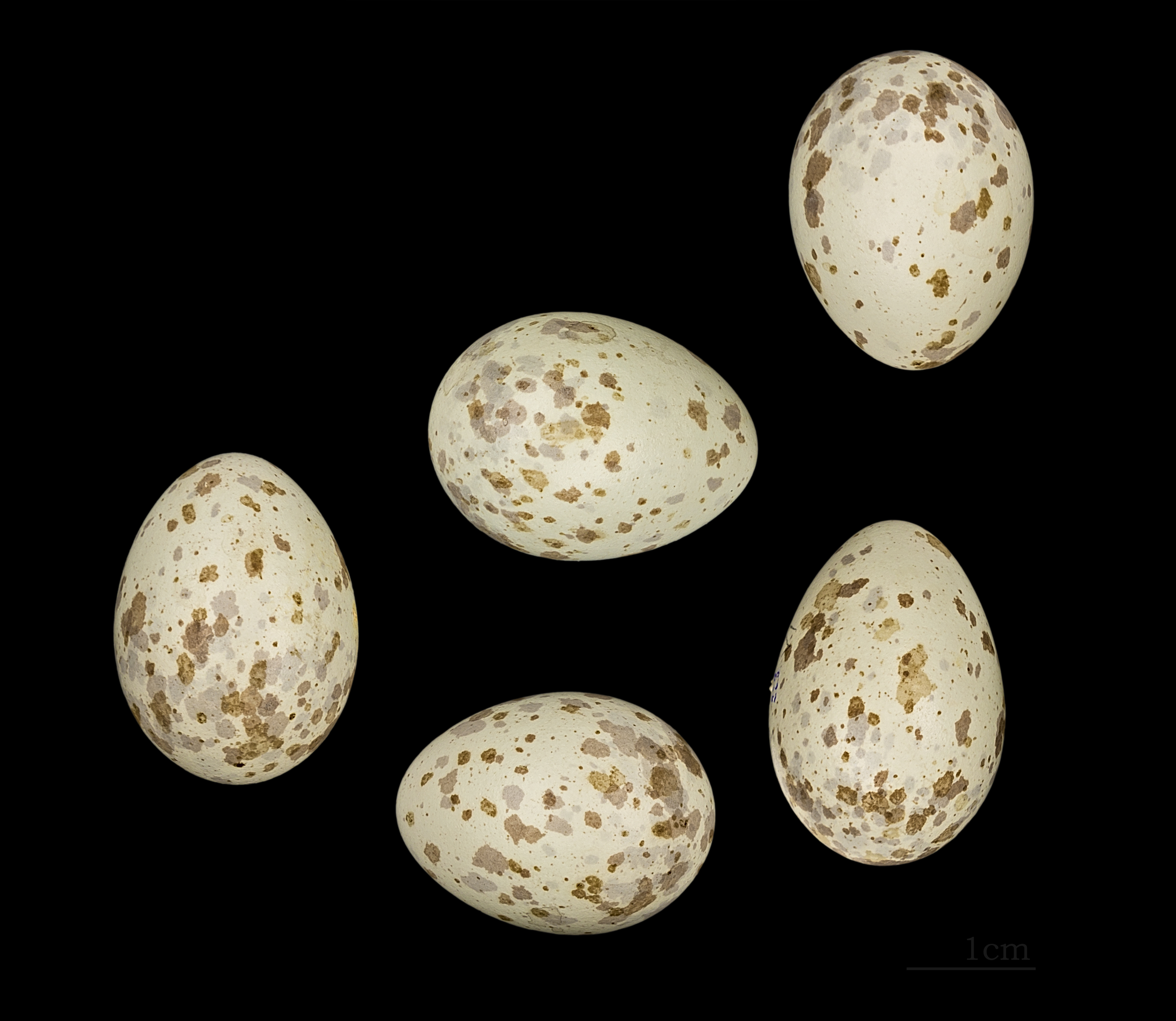
Lanius minor

The nest is often built in a roadside tree with good all-round visibility some 4 to 10 metres (13 to 33 ft) off the ground. It is built by both birds out of the stems of various flowering plants such as cudweed (Gnaphalium) and (Filago), and thyme (Thymus), and lined with whisps of wool, hairs, roots and feathers. There are five to seven eggs in the clutch, usually bluish green blotched with greenish-brown. Sometimes the background colour is cream or buff with pinkish-brown blotches. Their average size is 26.1 by 18.2 millimetres (1.03 in × 0.72 in). Incubation lasts about fifteen days and is chiefly done by the female though both parents take part. They both feed the young which are ready to leave the nest after about fourteen days. There is usually a single brood.

== Status ==
The lesser grey shrike has a world population estimated as being between two and a half and nine million individuals. These are spread out over a wide range and the IUCN, in its Red List of Threatened Species, lists the bird as being of "Least Concern". Though the number of birds may be decreasing slightly, this is not thought to be sufficient to raise the species to the more threatened "Vulnerable" category.

In Europe the numbers of lesser grey shrikes has been dwindling and there are now thought to be three to five thousand breeding pairs. The diminution in numbers may be due to a series of wet summers leading to a dearth of insects. Another factor may be changes in agricultural practices with small enclosures with varying crops and patches of woodland being replaced by large fields. As a result, this bird has been listed as a threatened species in Annex I of the European Commission Birds Directive.
