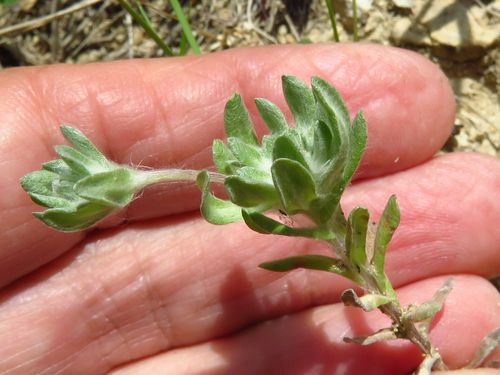

Conservation status
- Secure (NatureServe)

Scientific classification
- Kingdom: Plantae
- Clade: Tracheophytes
- Clade: Angiosperms
- Clade: Eudicots
- Clade: Asterids
- Order: Asterales
- Family: Asteraceae
- Genus: Diaperia
- Species: D. prolifera

Binomial name
- Diaperia prolifera (Nutt. ex DC.) Nutt.

Synonyms
- Evax prolifera Nutt. ex DC.; Filago nuttallii Shinners; Filago prolifera (Nutt. ex DC.) Britton

= Diaperia prolifera =

Species of flowering plant

Diaperia prolifera, common name big-head rabbit-tobacco, is a plant species native to the central part of the United States from Montana to New Mexico to Alabama. It prefers dry, open areas.

Diaperia prolifera is an annual herb up to 15 cm (6 inches) tall, grayish green to silvery because of thick woolly pubescence. The stem branches above ground, with leaves up to 15 mm long. Flower heads are usually produced one at a time, but occasionally in groups of 2–3.

Varieties

Two varieties are generally recognized, intergrading in their region of overlap in Texas and Oklahoma:

- Diaperia prolifera var. prolifera, grayish to green - Alabama, Arkansas, Colorado, Kansas, Louisiana, Mississippi, Missouri, Montana, Nebraska, New Mexico, Oklahoma, Texas, South Dakota, Wyoming
- Diaperia prolifera var. barnebyi Morefield, silvery white - New Mexico, Oklahoma, Texas
