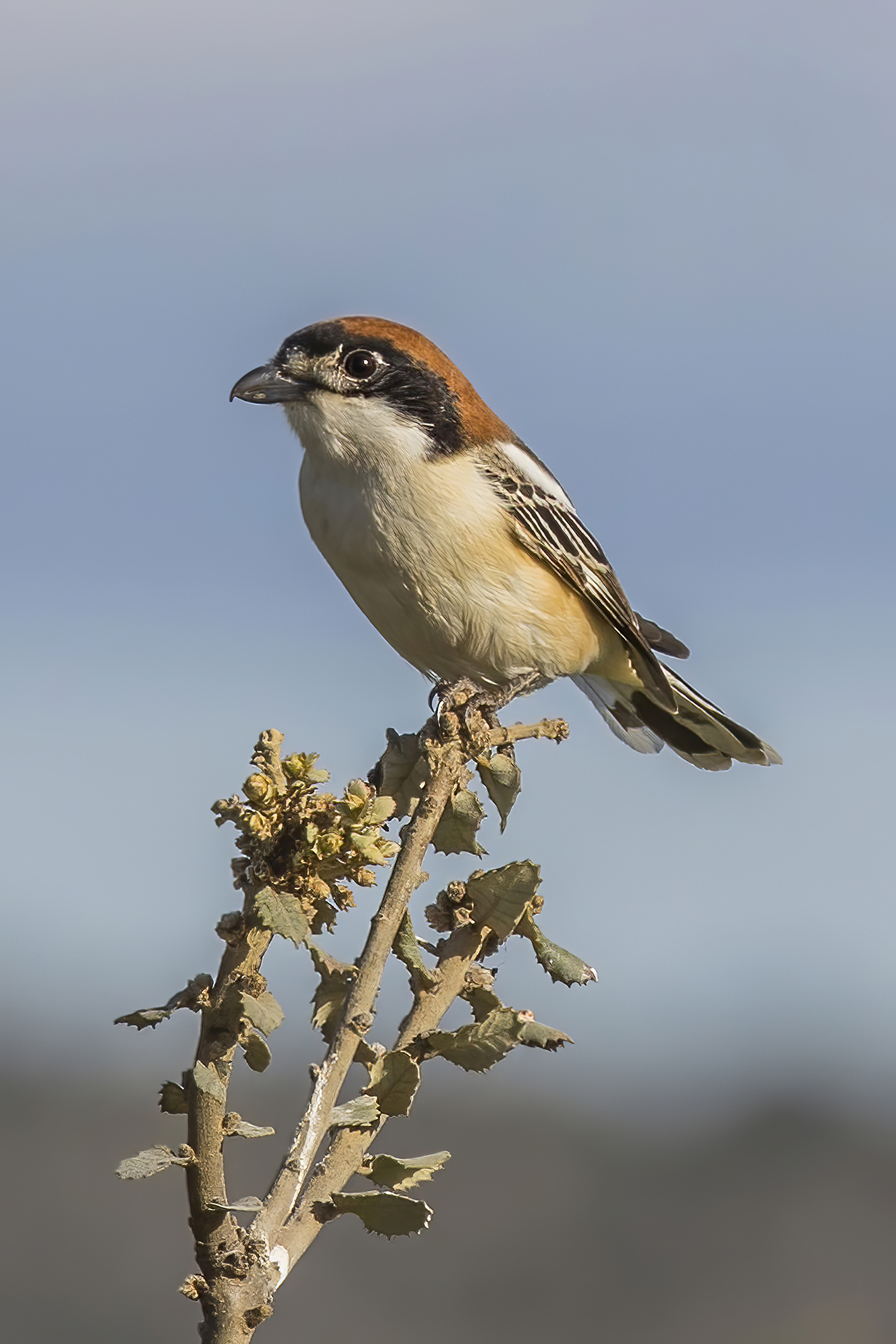
- Female L. s. senator in Spain

Conservation status
- Near Threatened (IUCN 3.1)

Scientific classification
- Kingdom: Animalia
- Phylum: Chordata
- Class: Aves
- Order: Passeriformes
- Family: Laniidae
- Genus: Lanius
- Species: L. senator

Binomial name
- Lanius senator Linnaeus, 1758
- Range of L. senator Breeding Passage Non-breeding

= Woodchat shrike =

Species of bird

The woodchat shrike (Lanius senator) is a member of the shrike family Laniidae. It can be identified by its red-brown crown and nape. It is mainly insectivorous and favours open wooded areas with scattered trees such as orchards, particularly when there is bare or sandy ground. The woodchat shrike breeds in southern Europe, the Middle East and northwest Africa, and winters in tropical Africa.

== Taxonomy ==
The woodchat shrike was formally described by the Swedish naturalist Carl Linnaeus in 1758 in the tenth edition of his Systema Naturae under the binomial name Lanius senator. Linnaeus based his description on the "red headed butcher-bird" that had been described and illustrated in 1734 by the English naturalist Eleazar Albin in the second volume of his A Natural History of Birds. Linnaeus mistakenly specified the type locality as "Indiis". This was corrected to the River Rhine in Germany by Ernst Hartert in 1907. The genus name, Lanius, is derived from the Latin word for "butcher", and some shrikes are also known as "butcher birds" because of their feeding habits. The specific senator is Latin for "senator", so-named because its chestnut cap recalled the colour of the stripe on the toga of a Roman senator. The common name "woodchat" is an Anglicisation of German waldkatze, literally "woodcat", and "shrike" is from Old English scríc, "shriek", referring to the shrill call.

A molecular phylogenetic study published in 2019 found that within the genus Lanius the woodchat shrike was sister to the lesser grey shrike (Lanius minor), a migratory species which breeds in the Mediterranean and steppe regions of the southern Palearctic. The two species diverged from each other around 3.9–5.0 million years ago.

Three subspecies are recognised:

- L. s. senator Linnaeus, 1758 – central, south Europe and north Africa
- L. s. badius Hartlaub, 1854 – west Mediterranean Islands
- L. s. niloticus (Bonaparte, 1853) – Cyprus and south Turkey to Iran
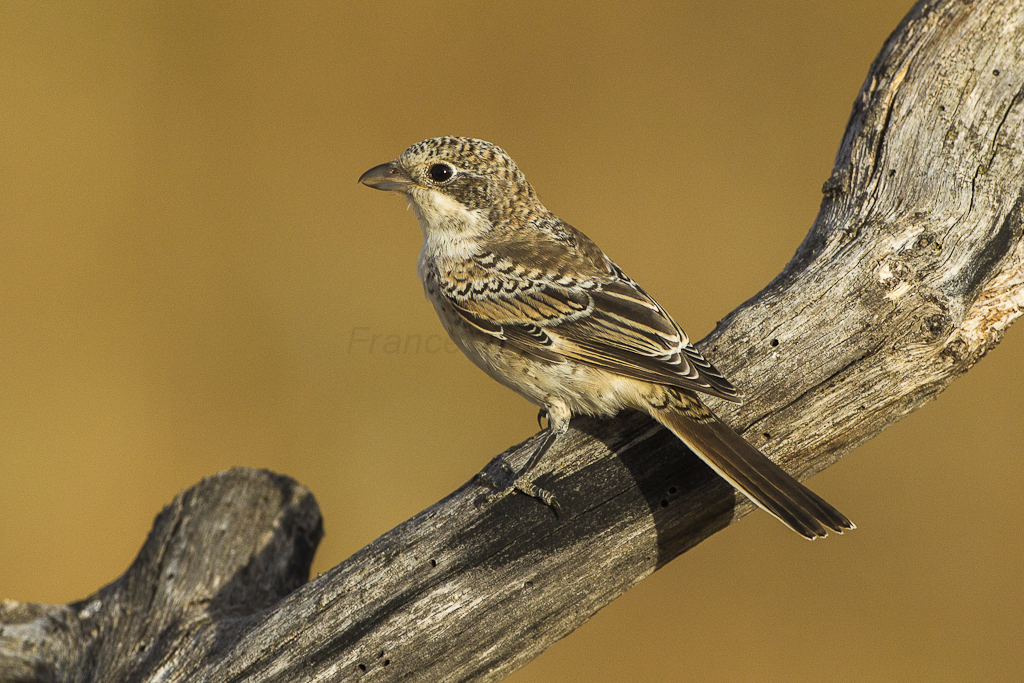
Juvenile L. s. senator, Spain

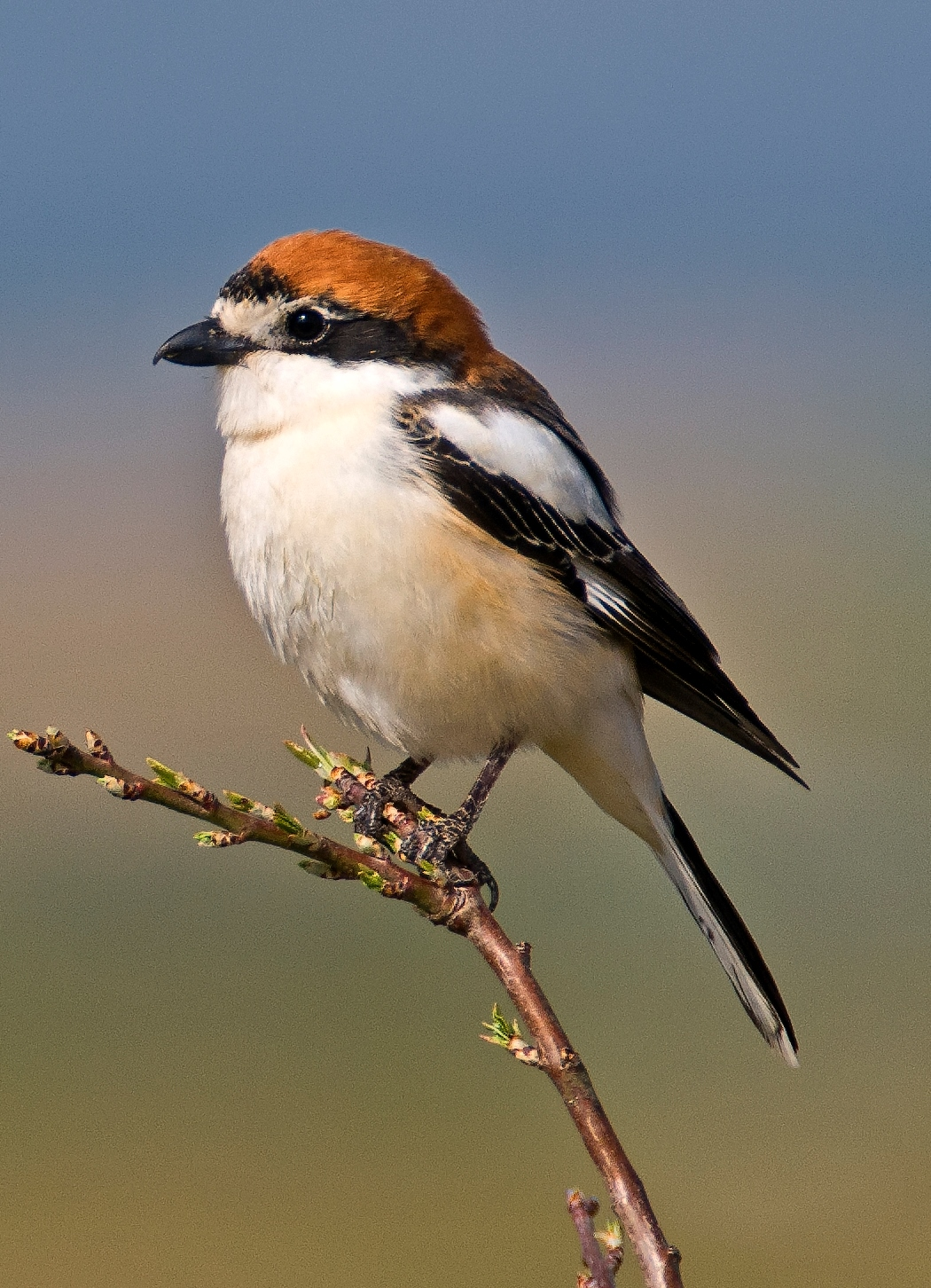
L. s. senator, Spain

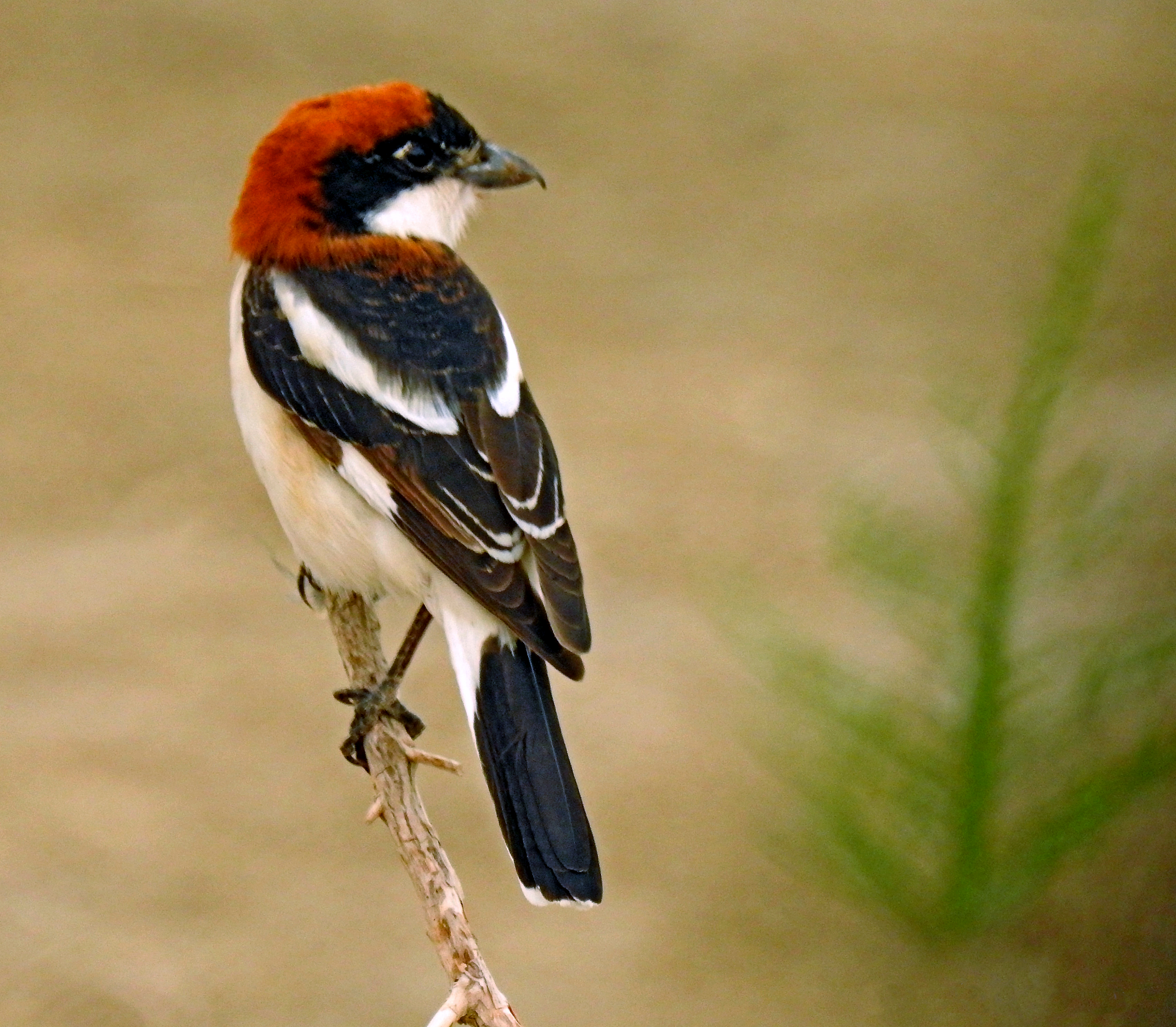
L. s. niloticus, Kuwait

== Description ==
The woodchat shrike is 17–19 cm (6.7–7.5 in) in overall length which is slightly larger than a red-backed shrike. The male is a striking bird with black and white upper parts, a chestnut crown and pure white underparts. The race L. s. badius of the western Mediterranean lacks the large white wing patches. In the female and young birds, the upperparts are brown and white and vermiculated. Underparts are buff and also vermiculated.

== Distribution and habitat ==
The breeding range of the woodchat shrike is in southern Europe, northern Africa and the Middle East. The range extends from Portugal to Greece, Turkey, Iraq and Iran, and in the Arabian Peninsula including Bahrain and Kuwait, and from Mauritania and Western Sahara in northern Africa to Libya. This bird overwinters in tropical central Africa, its winter range extending from Senegal to Sudan and Ethiopia in the east and southwards to Gabon. This species often overshoots its breeding range on spring migration, and is a rare, but annual, visitor to Great Britain. The Balearic race badius has occurred in Britain around four times as a vagrant, and has also been recorded once in Ireland.

== Behaviour and ecology ==
=== Breeding ===
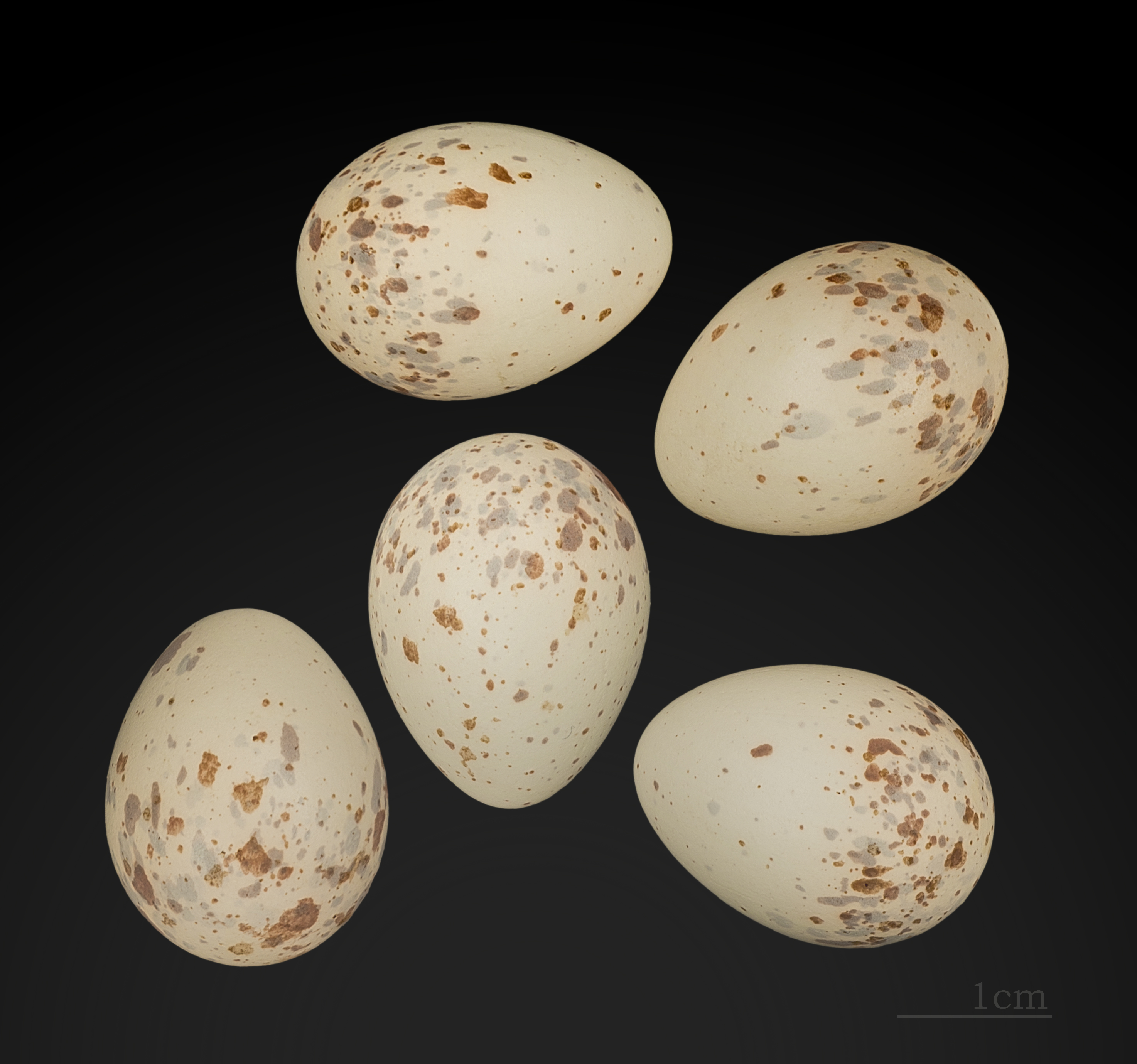
Eggs

Eggs are laid from early May to mid-July. The nest is built by both sexes and is placed in a tree, usually a fruit or olive tree. The nest is a strong cup of plant material which is lined with wool, hair, fine roots, cobwebs and lichen. The nest sometimes includes green plant material. The clutch is usually 5–6 eggs which are laid daily. The eggs are glossy and vary in colour: they can be pale olive-green, sandy, greyish-yellow or brown. They have brown to pale olive speckles concentrated at the broader end. For the nominate subspecies the average size is 23 mm × 17 mm (0.91 in × 0.67 in) with a calculated weight of 3.4 g (0.12 oz). After the last egg is laid they are incubated by the female; only very rarely does the male participate. The eggs hatch after 14–15 days. The young are cared for by both parents and fledge after 15–20 days. The parents continue to feed the fledgelings up to 3 to 4 weeks of age.

The longest lived woodchat shrike recorded by ring-recovery data is 5 years and eight months for a bird found dead in Germany.

=== Food and feeding ===
The woodchat shrike mainly eats insects, particularly beetles, but its diet can include other invertebrates and very occasionally small mammals and small birds. It hunts by perching on an exposed lookout such as on a branch of a tree or on a fence, typically 2–6 m (7–20 ft) above the ground, and then dropping or gliding down to its prey. It also makes sallying flights after flying insects. Small insects are crushed in its bill but large insects are dismembered. Impaling prey on a thorn has been recorded but is unusual. Indigestible material such as chitin, bones and hair is regurgitated as pellets.

== Population ==
Though it remains common, the woodchat shrike has been declining for a long period. In its European range, it is listed as a threatened species in many countries, such as France, Poland, and Switzerland. Due to its large population, estimated to be 5.9-10 million individuals, it was listed as a least concern species by the IUCN since 1988. The species for a long time had battled several devastating threats, including loss of habitat due to agriculture, afforestation, excessive use of pesticides, climate change shrinking the species' range, trans-migratory hunting, declines of insect prey and droughts.

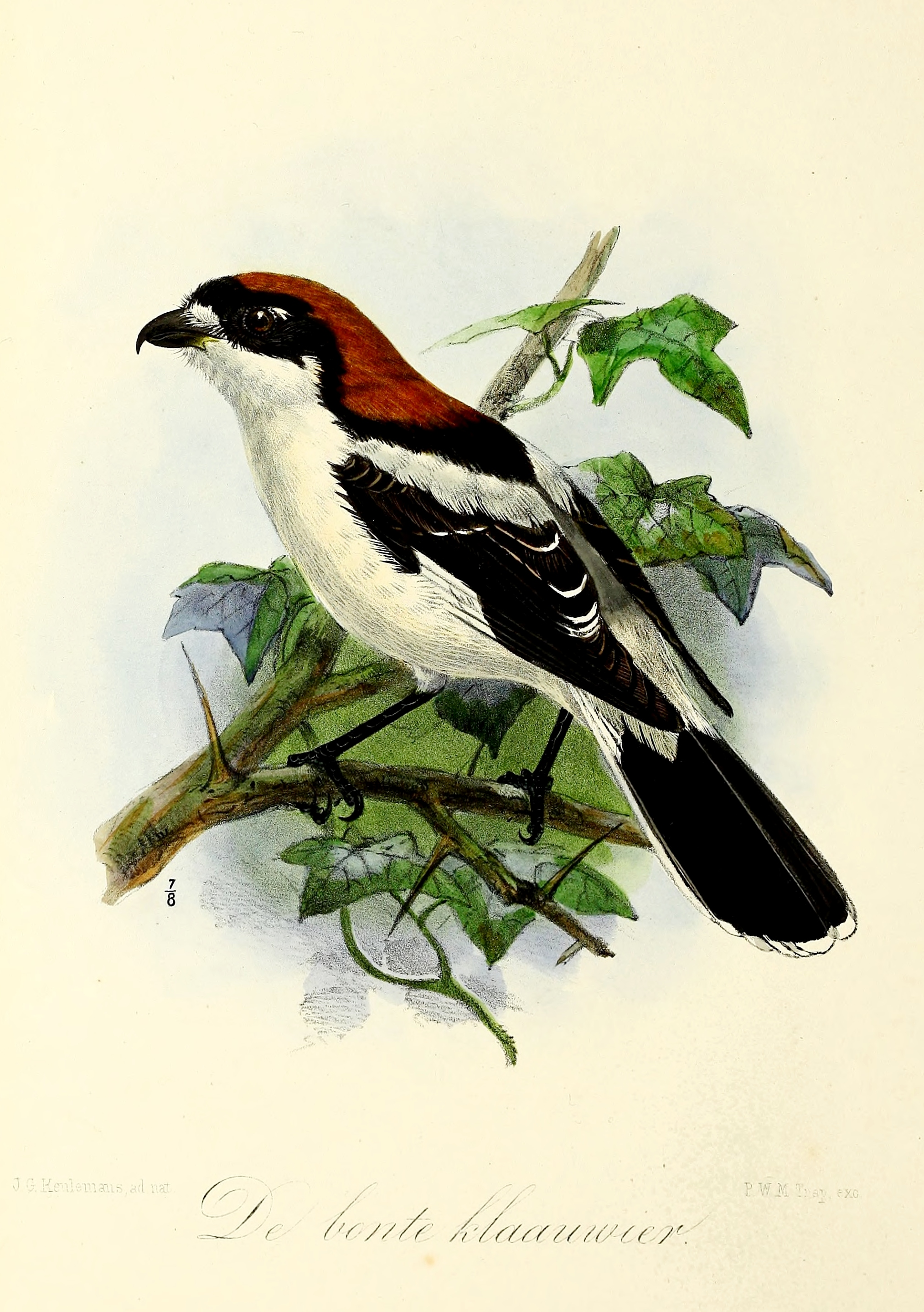
Illustration

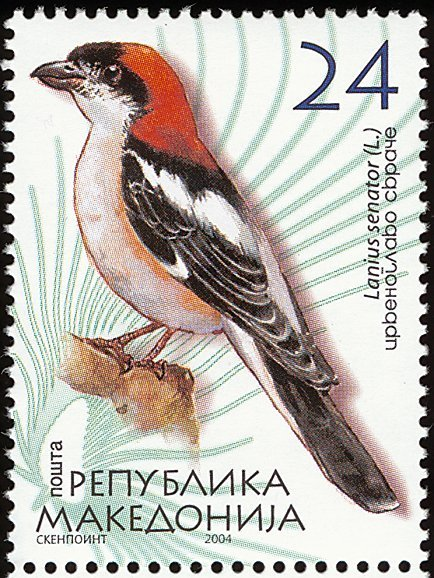
On a stamp of Macedonia (now North Macedonia)

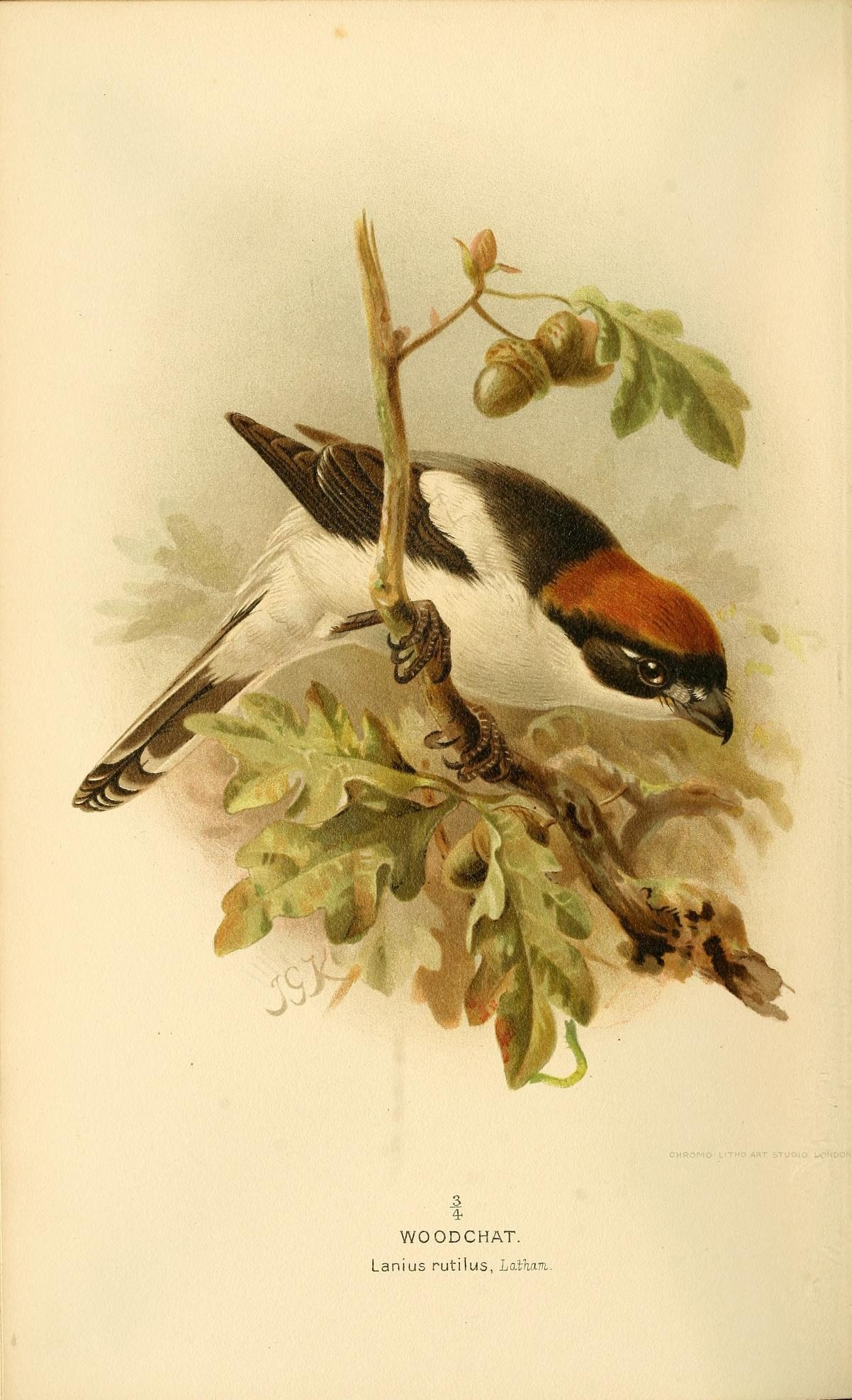

== Sources ==
- Cramp, Stanley; Perrins, C.M., eds. (1993). "Lanius senator Woodchat Shrike". Handbook of the Birds of Europe the Middle East and North Africa. The Birds of the Western Palearctic. Vol. VII: Flycatchers to Strikes. Oxford: Oxford University Press. pp. 523–542. ISBN 978-0-19-857510-8.
