= Filago discolor =

Scientific classification
- Kingdom: Plantae
- Clade: Tracheophytes
- Clade: Angiosperms
- Clade: Eudicots
- Clade: Asterids
- Order: Asterales
- Family: Asteraceae
- Genus: Filago
- Species: F. discolor

Binomial name
- Filago discolor (DC.) Andrés-Sánchez & Galbany

Synonyms
- List: Evacidium atlanticum Pomel; Evacidium discolor (DC.) Maire; Evacidium heldreichii Pomel; Evacopsis discolor (DC.) Pomel; Evacopsis heldreichii Pomel; Evax discolor DC.; Evax heldreichii Parl.; Filago atlantica Ball; Filago heldreichii Batt.

Genus of flowering plants

Filago discolor is a species of flowering plant in the family Asteraceae. It is native to Sicily, Malta, Algeria, and Morocco.
