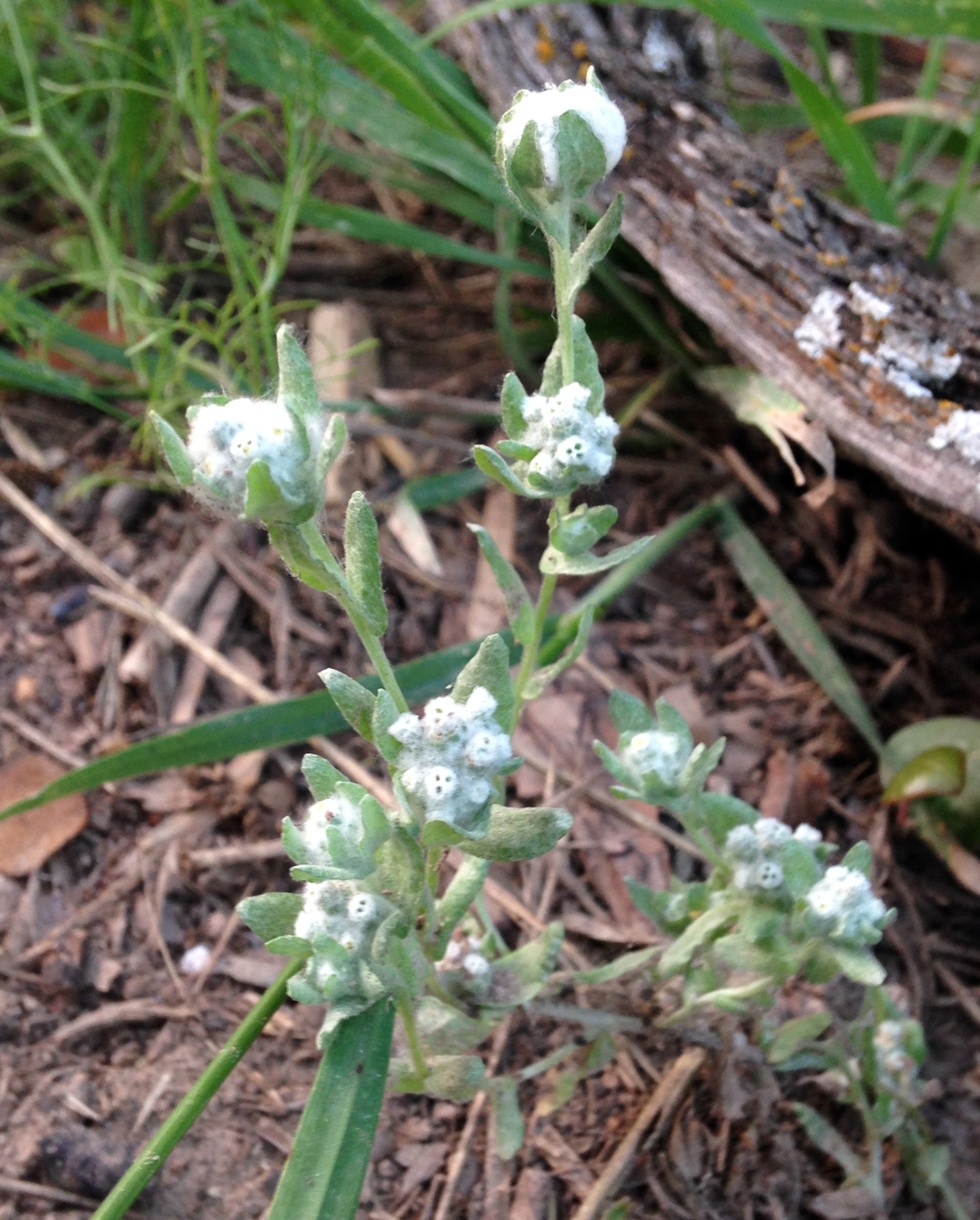

Scientific classification
- Kingdom: Plantae
- Clade: Tracheophytes
- Clade: Angiosperms
- Clade: Eudicots
- Clade: Asterids
- Order: Asterales
- Family: Asteraceae
- Genus: Diaperia
- Species: D. verna

Binomial name
- Diaperia verna Raf.

Synonyms
- Diaperia multicaulis (DC.) Nutt.; Evax nivea (Small) Cory; Evax verna Raf.; Filaginopsis multicaulis (DC.) Torr. & A.Gray; Filago nivea Small; Filago verna (Raf.) Shinners; Diaperia drummondii (Torr. & A.Gray) Benth., syn of var. drummondii; Filaginopsis drummondii Torr. & A.Gray, syn of var. drummondii

= Diaperia verna =

Species of flowering plant

Diaperia verna, common names spring pygmycudweed, spring rabbit-tobacco or many-stem rabbit-tobacco, is a plant species in the sunflower family, native to northern Mexico (from Sonora to Tamaulipas) and the southern United States (from Arizona to Louisiana, with isolated populations (possibly introductions) in Alabama, Georgia, South Carolina).

Diaperia verna is an herb with greenish or grayish leaves due to a coating of woolly hairs. One plant usually produces several flower heads, the corollas hidden by surrounding bracts.

Varieties

- Diaperia verna var. drummondii (Torr. & A.Gray) Morefield - coastal Alabama + Texas
- Diaperia verna var. verna - Arizona, Arkansas, Georgia, Louisiana, New Mexico, Oklahoma, South Carolina, Texas; Mexico (Chihuahua, Coahuila, Nuevo León, Sonora, Tamaulipas).
