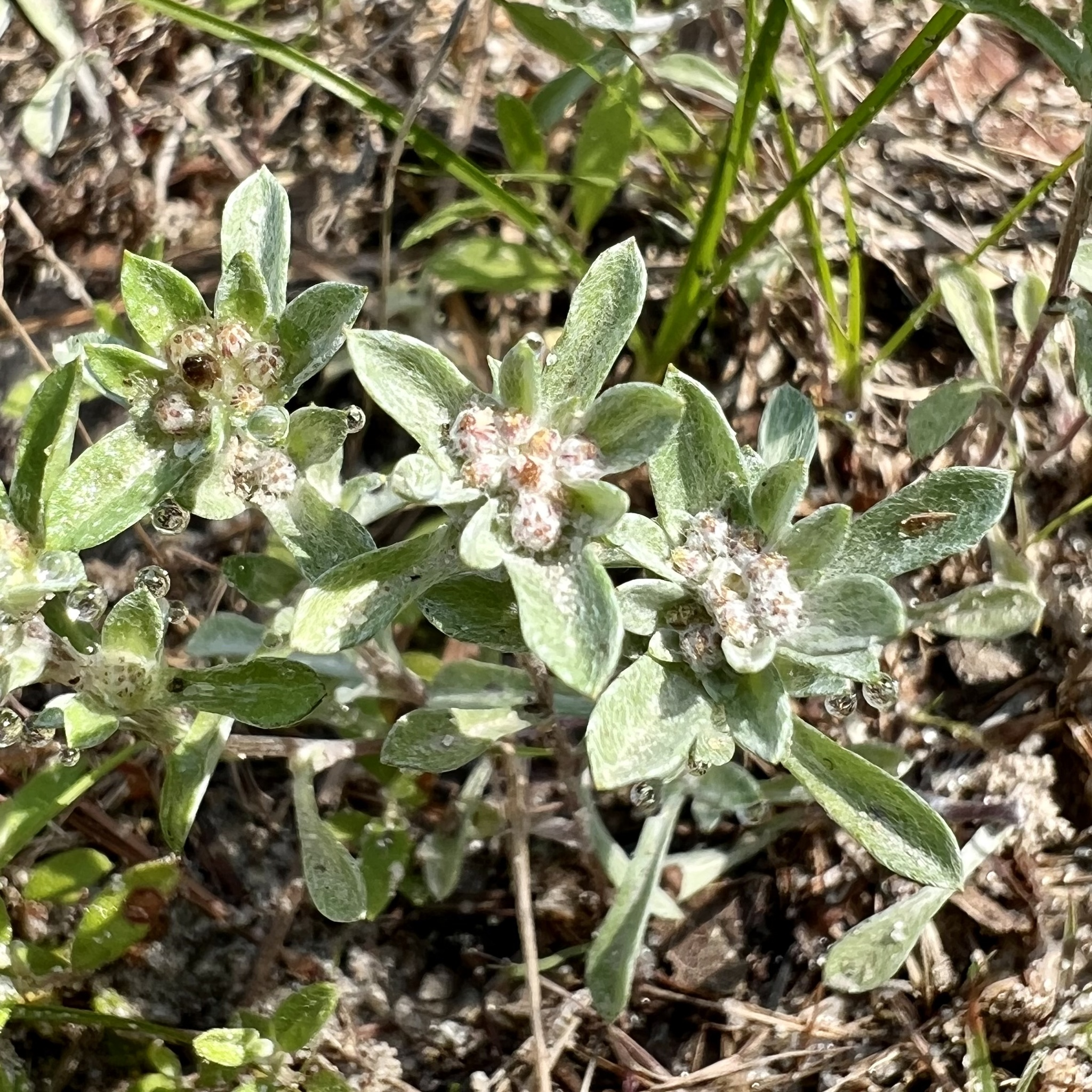

Scientific classification
- Kingdom: Plantae
- Clade: Tracheophytes
- Clade: Angiosperms
- Clade: Eudicots
- Clade: Asterids
- Order: Asterales
- Family: Asteraceae
- Genus: Diaperia
- Species: D. candida

Binomial name
- Diaperia candida (Torr. & A.Gray) Benth. & Hook.f.

Synonyms
- Calymmandra candida Torr. & A.Gray; Evax candida (Torr. & A.Gray) A.Gray; Filago candida (Torr. & A.Gray) Shinners

= Diaperia candida =

Species of flowering plant

Diaperia candida, common names silver pygmycudweed and silver rabbit-tobacco, is a plant species in the sunflower family, native to the south-central part of the United States: Texas, western Louisiana, southwestern Arkansas, southeastern Oklahoma.

Diaperia candida is an annual herb with leaves that appear silvery because of woolly hairs pressed against the surface. One plant generally has several small flower heads. Flowers bloom March to June. Its habitats include oak and pine woodlands, prairies, and coastal areas.
