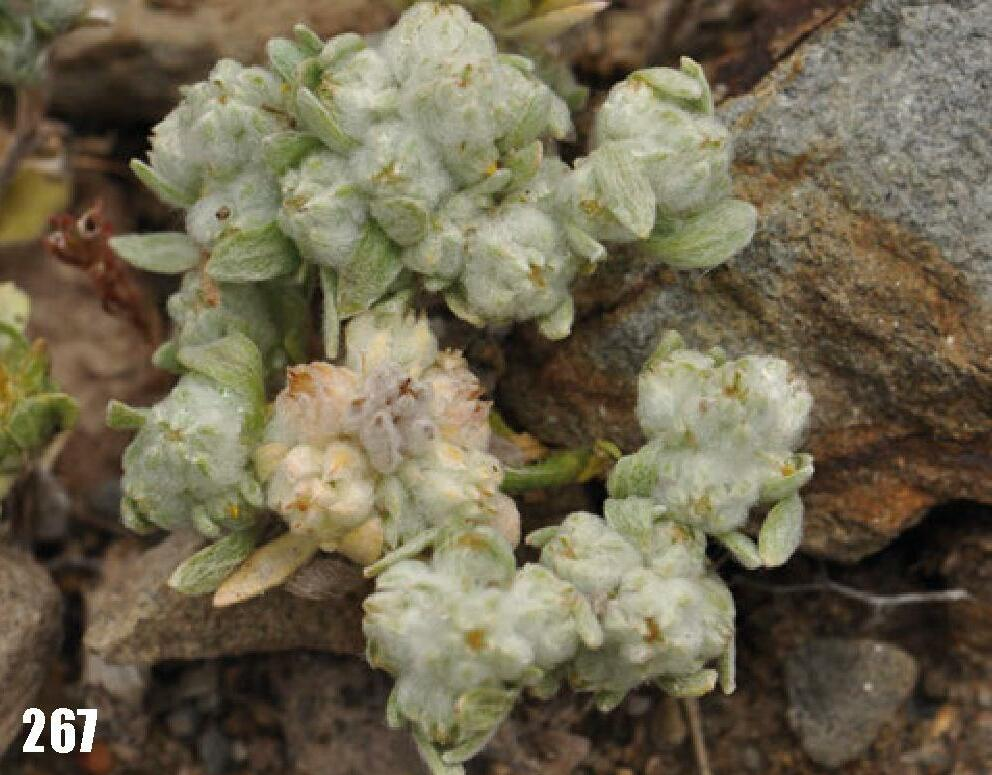

Scientific classification
- Kingdom: Plantae
- Clade: Tracheophytes
- Clade: Angiosperms
- Clade: Eudicots
- Clade: Asterids
- Order: Asterales
- Family: Asteraceae
- Genus: Filago
- Species: F. griffithii

Binomial name
- Filago griffithii (A.Gray) Andrés-Sánchez & Galbany

Synonyms
- List: Cymbolaena griffithii (A.Gray) Wagenitz; Cymbolaena longifolia (Boiss. & Reut.) Smoljan.; Filago longifolia (Boiss. & Reut.) Myrz.; Micropus longifolius Boiss. & Reut.; Stylocline griffithii A.Gray

= Filago griffithii =

Genus of flowering plants

Filago griffithii is a species of flowering plant in the family Asteraceae. It is found from the eastern Mediterranean to central Asia and Pakistan.

This species is an annual herb coated with appressed gray hairs. The stem is very short and the branches extend outward, making the plant squat in stature, sometimes forming a patch on the ground. The alternately arranged leaves are linear. The disc-shaped flower heads are clustered in glomerules 1 or 2 centimeters wide. There are layers of tiny woolly phyllaries around the flower head. It contains usually 4 tubular florets each no more than 1.5 millimeters long. Cypselas from bisexual florets have deciduous white pappi, and those from female florets lack pappi.
