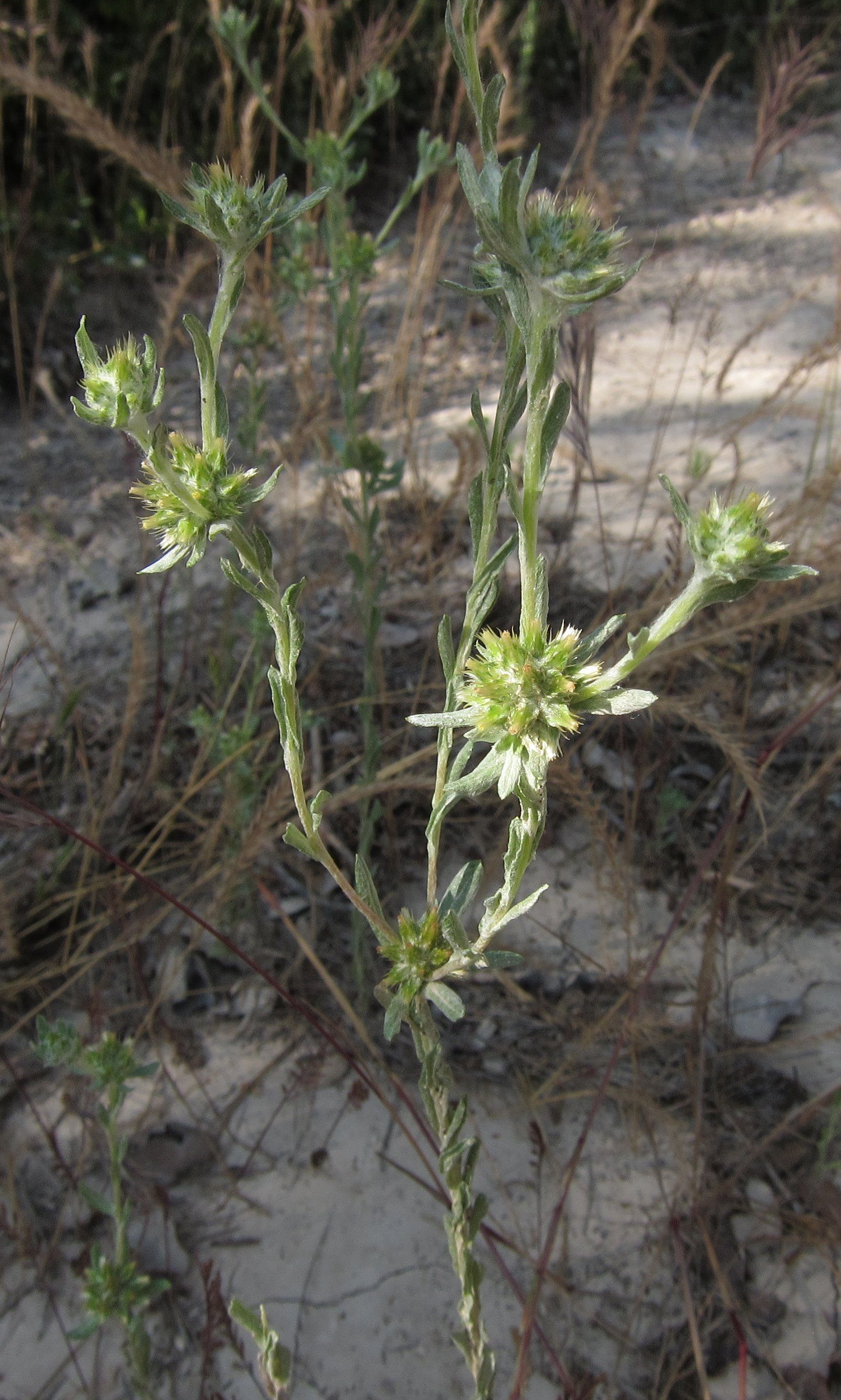

Scientific classification
- Kingdom: Plantae
- Clade: Tracheophytes
- Clade: Angiosperms
- Clade: Eudicots
- Clade: Asterids
- Order: Asterales
- Family: Asteraceae
- Genus: Filago
- Species: F. pyramidata

Binomial name
- Filago pyramidata L. 1753

Synonyms
- Synonymy: Evax tenuifolia Guss.; Filago affinis Tineo ex Nyman; Filago caespitosa Raf. ex DC.; Filago candolleana Parl.; Filago canescens Jord.; Filago cossyrensis Ten. ex Lojac.; Filago cuneata Lojac; Filago decumbens (Heldr.) Holmboe; Filago gussonei Lojac.; Filago jussiaei Coss. & Germ.; Filago kaitenbachii Sch.Bip. ex Nyman; Filago numidica Pomel; Filago prostrata Parl.; Filago pseudoevax Rouy; Filago robusta Pomel; Filago rotundata Moench; Filago spathulata C.Presl; Filago subspicata Boreau; Gifola canescens (Jord.) Fourr.; Gifola gussonei (Lojac.) Chrtek & Holub; Gifola numidica (Pomel) Chrtek & Holub; Gifola pseudo-evax (Rouy) Chrtek & Holub; Gifola pyramidalis Dumort.; Gifola pyramidata (L.) Dumort.; Gifola robusta (Pomel) Chrtek & Holub; Gifola spathulata Rchb.f.; Gifola vulgaris (Lam.) Cass.; Gnaphalium germanicum L.; Gnaphalium pyramidatum (L.) Lam.

= Filago pyramidata =

Species of flowering plant

Filago pyramidata, the broadleaf cottonrose or broad-leaved cudweed, is a European plant species in the family Asteraceae. It is native to the Mediterranean region of southern Europe, northern Africa, and the Middle East, plus Great Britain, the Low Countries, and Germany. It is also naturalized in scattered locations in North America (British Columbia, Oregon, California) and Australia (South Australia, Victoria), Pakistan, and other places.

Filago pyramidata is an annual plant up to 30 cm (12 in) tall, covered with woolly hairs. It produces flower heads in dense clumps of 8-16 heads, each containing several small flowers.
