= Filago prolifera =

Scientific classification
- Kingdom: Plantae
- Clade: Tracheophytes
- Clade: Angiosperms
- Clade: Eudicots
- Clade: Asterids
- Order: Asterales
- Family: Asteraceae
- Genus: Filago
- Species: F. prolifera

Binomial name
- Filago prolifera Pomel

Species of flowering plant

Filago prolifera is a species of flowering plant in the family Asteraceae. It is native to northern Africa and the Arabian Peninsula.
