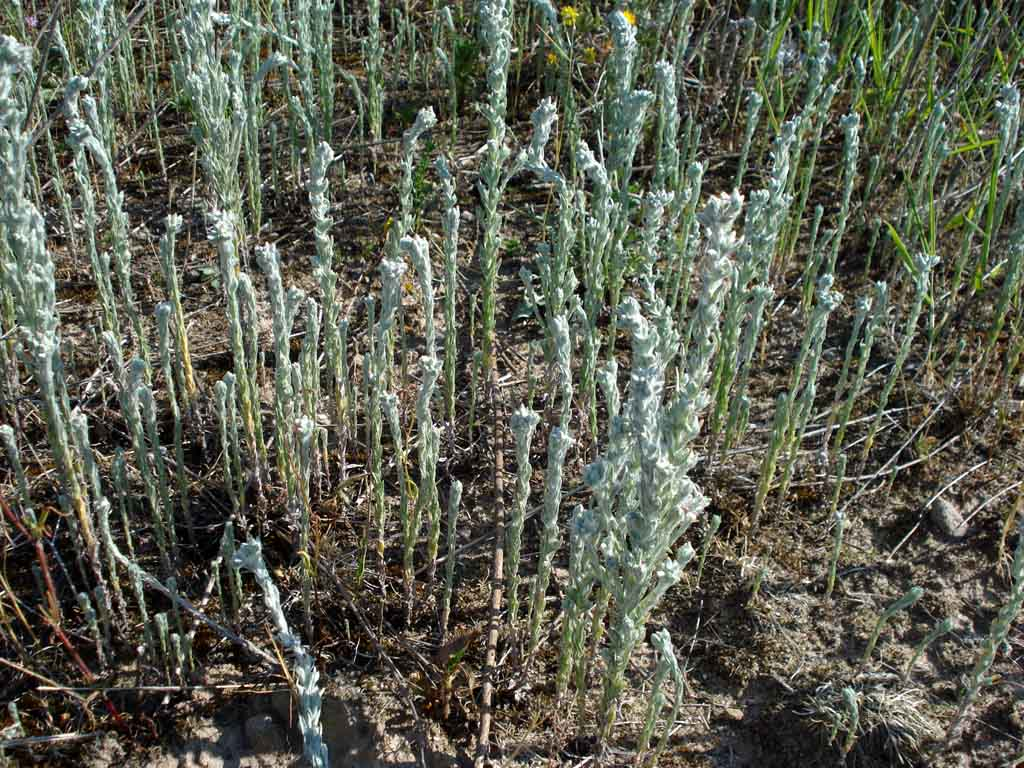

Scientific classification
- Kingdom: Plantae
- Clade: Tracheophytes
- Clade: Angiosperms
- Clade: Eudicots
- Clade: Asterids
- Order: Asterales
- Family: Asteraceae
- Genus: Filago
- Species: F. arvensis

Binomial name
- Filago arvensis L.

= Filago arvensis =

Species of flowering plant

Filago arvensis is a species of plant belonging to the family Asteraceae.

It is native to Europe to Western Siberia and Western Himalaya, Canary Islands, Morocco.
