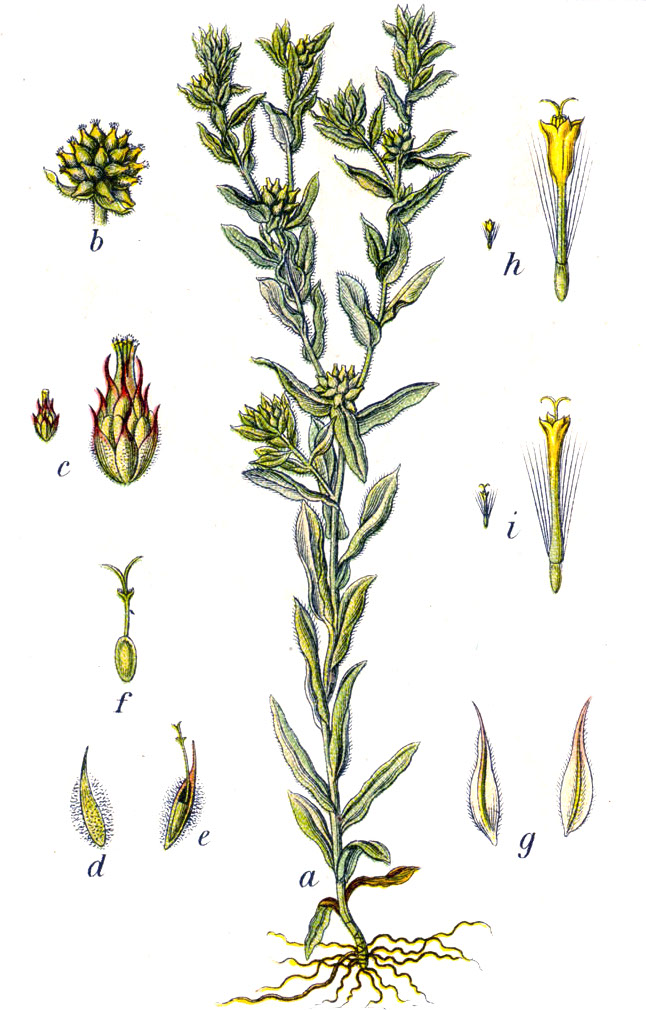
- botanical illustration of Filago vulgaris

Scientific classification
- Kingdom: Plantae
- Clade: Tracheophytes
- Clade: Angiosperms
- Clade: Eudicots
- Clade: Asterids
- Order: Asterales
- Family: Asteraceae
- Genus: Filago
- Species: F. vulgaris

Binomial name
- Filago vulgaris Lam.

Synonyms
- Filago germanica (L.) Huds.

= Filago vulgaris =

Species of flowering plant

Filago vulgaris or Filago germanica, commonly known as common cudweed or common cottonrose, is an annual herbaceous plant of the genus Filago. It is in the tribe Inuleae of the sunflower family, Asteraceae. Common names also include: Danish—Kugle-museurt, and Norwegian—Kuleullurt.

== Distribution ==
Filago vulgaris is native to Europe, from the Mediterranean region north to Northern Ireland, Scotland. It is found in grassland, sand dunes, rocky ledges, and cultivated fields. It is a listed Near Threatened species in the Red Data Book for England, due to agricultural practices.

It is a naturalized introduced species in the Northwestern and Eastern United States, and in British Columbia and Ontario, Canada.

Description

Filago vulgaris can reach 5–30 centimetres (2.0–11.8 in) in height. The linear wavy-edged leaves and the stems are a white and woolly in texture and appearance.

The plant blooms July to September, with dense, terminal flowerheads, flowers that are light yellow.
