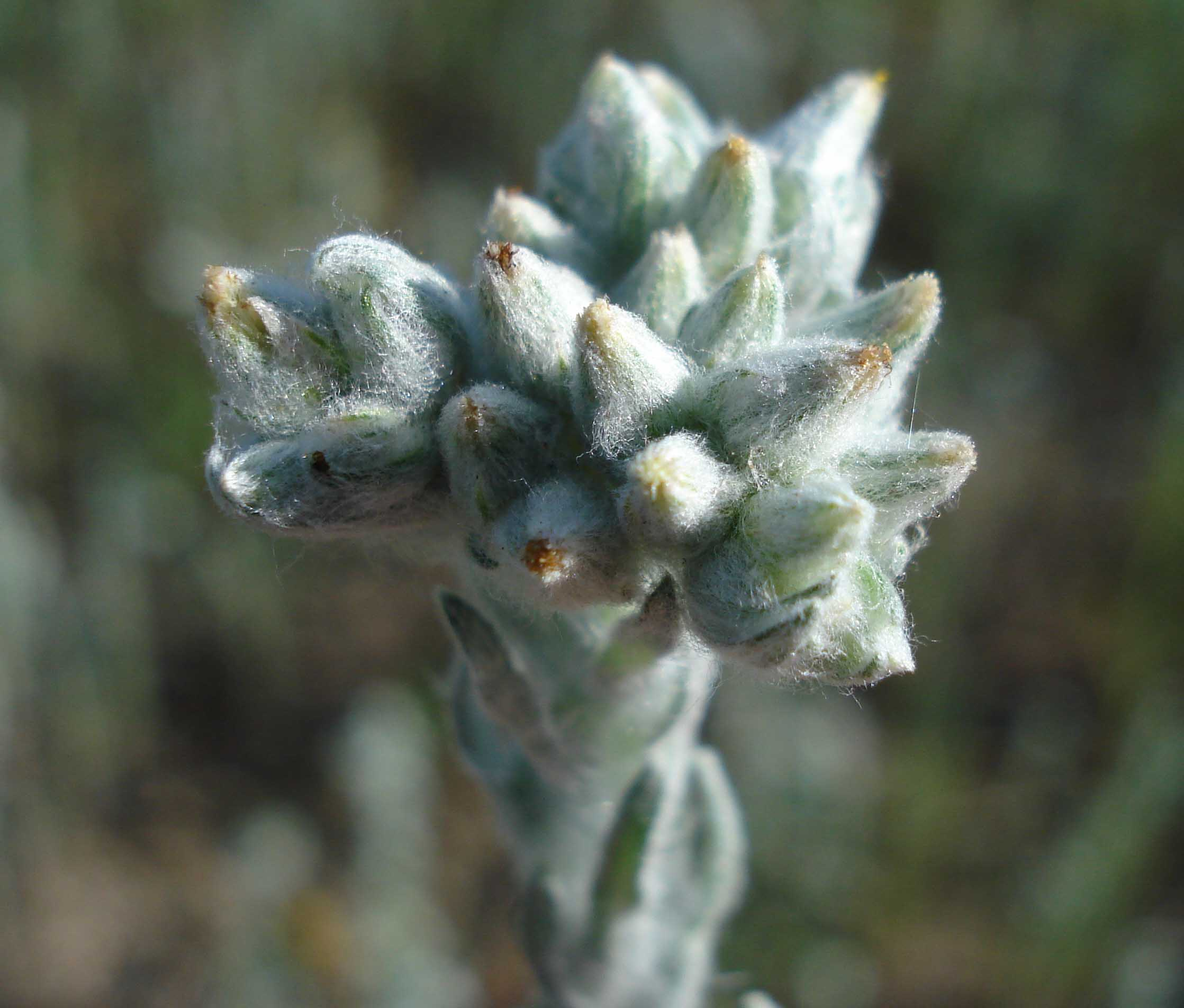
- Filago arvensis

Scientific classification
- Kingdom: Plantae
- Clade: Tracheophytes
- Clade: Angiosperms
- Clade: Eudicots
- Clade: Asterids
- Order: Asterales
- Family: Asteraceae
- Subfamily: Asteroideae
- Tribe: Gnaphalieae
- Genus: Filago; Loefl. ex L.

Synonyms
- List: Achariterium Bluff & Fingerh.; Cymbolaena Smoljan.; Evacidium Smoljan.; Evacopsis Pomel; Evax Gaertn.; Filagopsis (Batt.) Rouy; ×Giflifa Chrtek & Holub; Gifola Cass.; Gifolaria Coss. ex Pomel; Impia Bluff & Fingerh.; Oglifa (Cass.) Cass.; Pseudevax Pomel

= Filago (plant) =

Genus of flowering plants

Filago is a genus of plants in the sunflower family, native from Europe and northern Africa to Mongolia, Nepal, and Macaronesia. They are sometimes called cottonroses or cudweeds.

The name cudweed comes from the fact that they were once used to feed cows that had lost the ability to chew the cud.

Several species are sometimes treated as members of the genus Logfia.

== Description ==
They bear woolly, cottony heads of flowers. They have narrow strap-shaped untoothed leaves. The flower heads are small, gathered into dense, stalkless clusters. The fruits have a hairy pappus, or modified calyx, the part of an individual disk, ray or ligule floret surrounding the base of the corolla, in flower heads of the plant family Asteraceae.

== Species ==
The following species are recognised in the genus Filago:

- Filago aberrans Wagenitz
- Filago abyssinica Sch.Bip. ex A.Rich.
- Filago aegaea Wagenitz
- Filago anatolica (Boiss. & Heldr.) Chrtek & Holub
- Filago arenaria (Smoljan.) Chrtek & Holub
- Filago argentea (Pomel) Chrtek & Holub
- Filago arizonica A.Gray
- Filago arvensis L.
- Filago asterisciflora (Lam.) Sweet
- Filago californica Nutt. - California cottonrose
- Filago carpetana (Lange) Chrtek & Holub
- Filago castroviejoi Andrés-Sánchez, D.Gutt.Larr., E.Rico & M.M.Mart.Or
- Filago congesta DC.
- Filago contracta (Boiss.) Chrtek & Holub
- Filago cretensis Gand.
- Filago crocidion (Pomel) Chrtek & Holub
- Filago cuneata Lojac.
- Filago depressa A.Gray
- Filago desertorum Pomel
- Filago cuneata Lojac.
- Filago discolor (DC.) Andrés-Sánchez & Galbany
- Filago duriaei Coss. ex Lange
- Filago eriocephala Guss.
- Filago eriosphaera (Boiss. & Heldr.) Chrtek & Holub
- Filago filaginoides (Kar. & Kir.) Wagenitz
- Filago fuscescens Pomel
- Filago germanica (L.) Hudson - common cudweed
- Filago griffithii (A.Gray) Andrés-Sánchez & Galbany
- Filago hispanica (Degen & Hervier) Chrtek & Holub
- Filago hurdwarica (Wall. ex DC.) Wagenitz
- Filago inexpectata Wagenitz
- Filago libyaca (Alavi) Greuter
- Filago lojaconoi (Brullo) Greuter
- Filago longilanata (Maire & Wilczek) Greuter
- Filago lusitanica (Samp.) P.Silva
- Filago lutescens Jord. - red-tipped cudweed
- Filago mareotica Delile
- Filago mauritanica (Pomel) Dobignard
- Filago micropodioides Lange
- Filago neglecta (Soy.-Will.) DC.
- Filago nevadensis (Boiss.) Wagenitz & Greuter
- Filago palaestina (Boiss.) Chrtek & Holub
- Filago paradoxa Wagenitz
- Filago perpusilla (Boiss. & Heldr.) Chrtek & Holub
- Filago pertomentosa F.Ghahrem. & Akhundz.
- Filago petro-ianii Rita & Dittrich
- Filago prolifera Pomel
- Filago pygmaea L.
- Filago pyramidata L. - broad-leaved cudweed
- Filago ramosissima Lange
- Filago sahariensis Chrtek & Holub
- Filago tyrrhenica Chrtek & Holub
- Filago wagenitziana Bergmeier

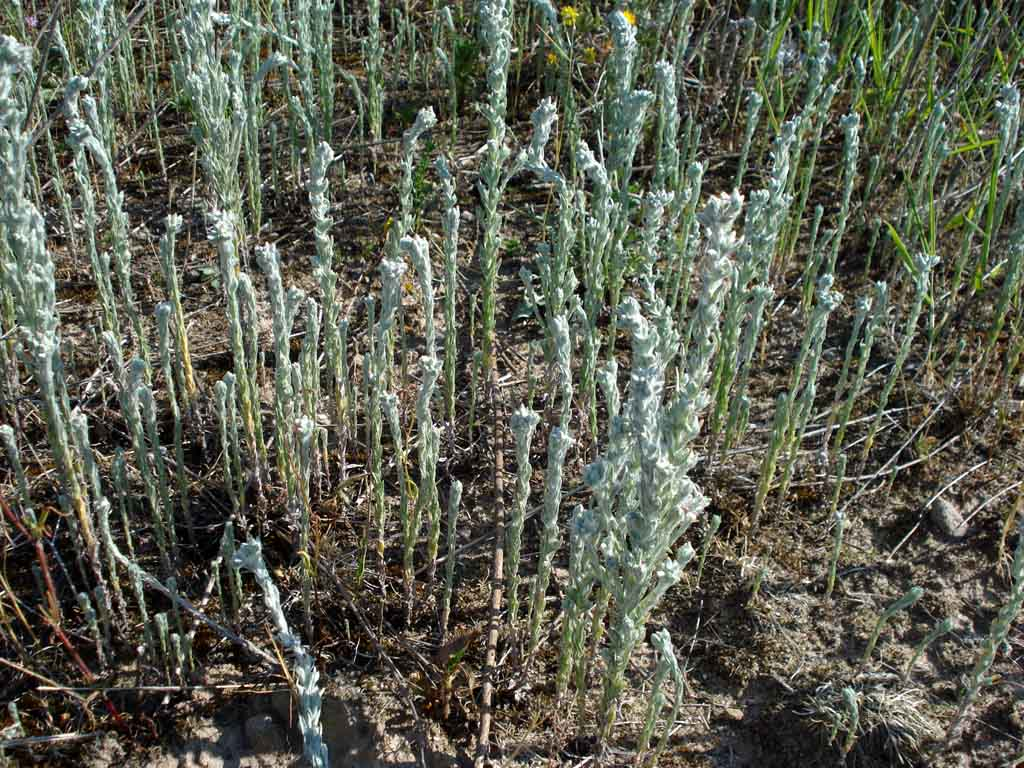
Filago arvensis
