= Outline of Somaliland =

Somalia Overview of and topical guide to Somaliland

The flag of Somaliland

The national emblem of Somaliland

Map of Somaliland

An enlargeable map of Somaliland

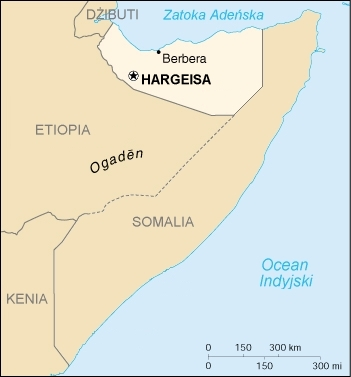
An enlargeable map of Somaliland

Blank map of Somaliland, Somalia

The following outline is provided as an overview and topical guide to Somaliland:

Somaliland – is an internationally unrecognised country. The government of Somaliland regards the territory as the successor state to the British Somaliland protectorate, which was independent for a few days in 1960 as the State of Somaliland, before voluntarily uniting with the Trust Territory of Somalia (the former Italian Somaliland) later the same week to form the Somali Republic.

== General reference ==
- Common English country name: Somaliland
- Official English country name: The Republic of Somaliland
- Common endonym(s):
  - Somali: Somaliland
  - Arabic: أرض الصومال
- Common endonym(s):
- Official endonym(s):
- Adjectival(s): Somali
- Demonym(s): Somalilander
- ISO country codes: **
- ISO region codes: **
- Internet country code top-level domain: None

== Geography of Somaliland ==
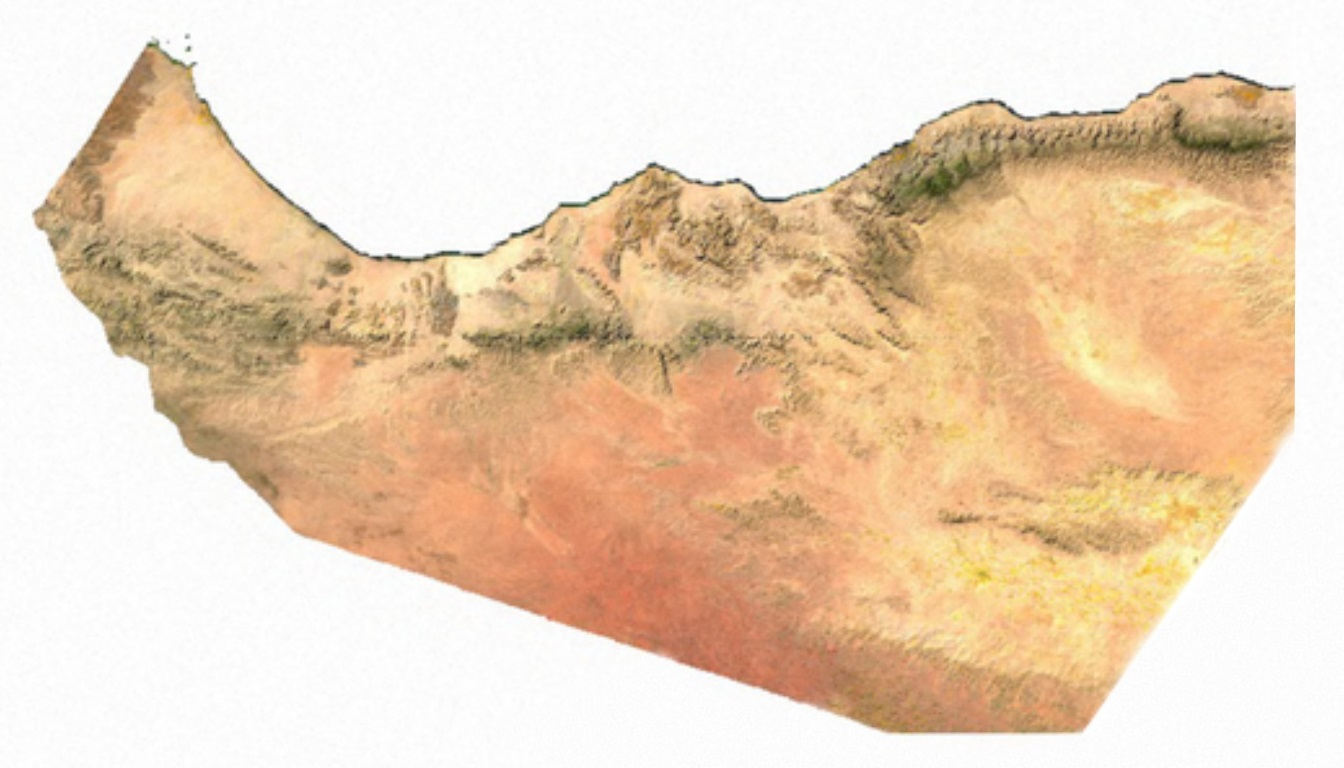
An enlargeable satellite image of Somaliland

- Somaliland is: a country
- Location:
  - Eastern Hemisphere, on the Equator
  - Africa
    - East Africa
      - Horn of Africa
  - Time zone: East Africa Time (UTC+03)
  - Extreme points of Somaliland
    - High: Shimbiris 2,450 m (8,038 ft)
    - Low: Guban −100 m (−328 ft)
  - Land boundaries:

Djibouti 60 km
Ethiopia 766 km
Somalia 402 km

- Coastline: 850,800 km

- Population of Somaliland: 5.7 million
- Area of Somaliland: 176,120 km^{2}
- Atlas of Somaliland

=== Environment of Somaliland ===
An enlargeable Geographic map of Somaliland

- Climate of Somaliland
- Environmental issues in Somaliland
- Ecoregions in Somaliland
- Protected areas of Somaliland
  - National parks of Somaliland
- Wildlife of Somaliland
  - Flora of Somaliland
  - Fauna of Somaliland
    - Birds of Somaliland

==== Natural geographic features of Somaliland ====
- Glaciers in Somaliland: none
- Rivers of Somaliland

==== Ecoregions of Somaliland ====
List of ecoregions in Somaliland

=== Location of Somaliland ===
- Republic of Somaliland is situated within the following regions:
  - Eastern Hemisphere and Southern Hemisphere
  - Africa
      - Horn of Africa
        - Republic of Somaliland is regarded internationally as a fully autonomous country claimed by Somalia, although it meets all criteria of Montevideo Convention.
  - Time zone: East Africa Time (UTC+03)

==== Administrative divisions of Somaliland ====
Administrative divisions of Somaliland

- Regions of Somaliland
  - Districts of Somaliland
    - Cities in Somaliland

===== Regions of Somaliland =====
Map of Somaliland regions

Regions of Somaliland

- Awdal
- Maroodi Jeeh
- Sahil
- Sool
- Togdheer
- Sanaag

===== Administrative districts of Somaliland =====
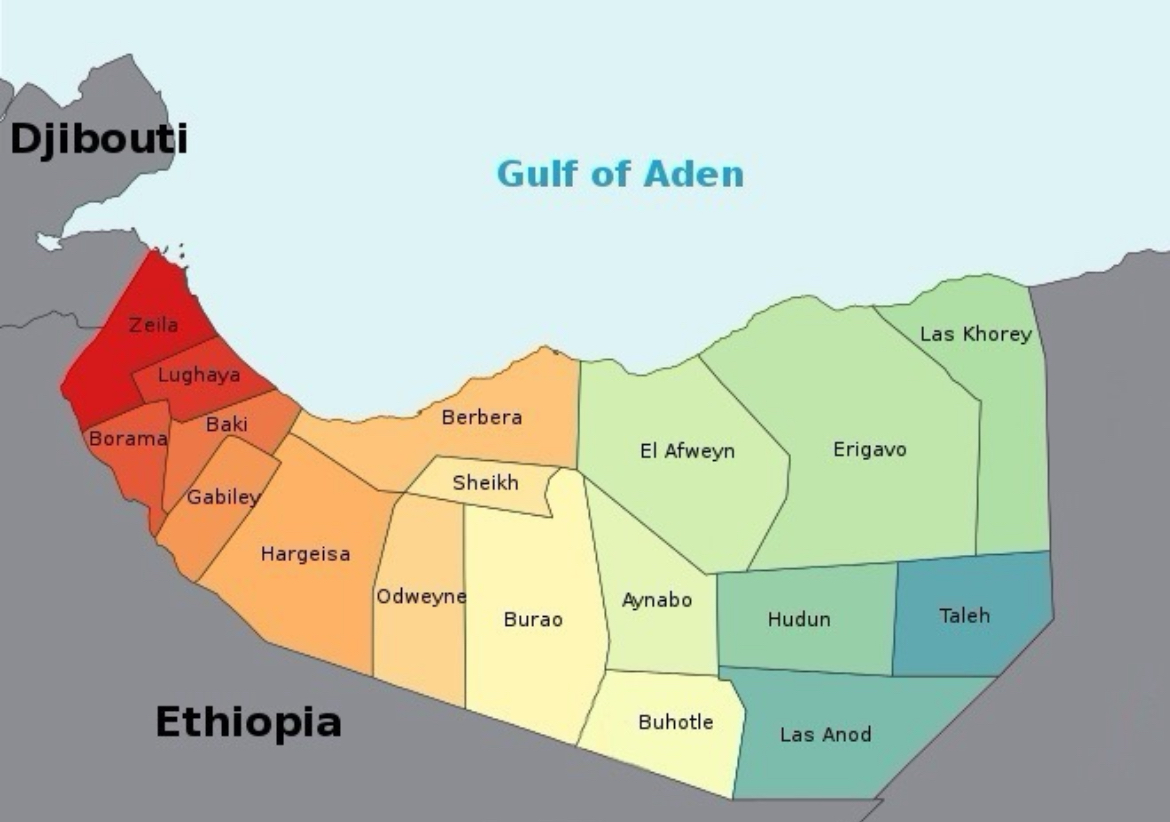
Map of Somaliland districts

The regions are divided into eighteen administrative districts.

- Sheikh
- Berbera
- Baki
- Borama
- Zeila
- Lughaya
- Aynabo
- Las Anod
- Taleh
- Hudun
- Odweyne
- Buhoodle
- Gabiley
- Hargeisa
- Burao
- El Afweyn
- Erigavo
- Lasqoray

===== Cities in Somaliland =====
The main cities and towns in Somaliland:

- Hargeisa (Hargeysa), capital
- Burco (Burao)
- Boorama (Borama)
- Berbera
- Ceerigaabo (Erigabo)
- Las Anod (Laascaanood)
- Gabiley (Gabileh)
- Baligubadle
- Zeila (Saylac)
- Odweyne
- Lasqoray

=== Demography of Somaliland ===
Demographics of Somaliland

=== Presidents of the Somaliland ===
- Abdirahman Ahmed Ali Tuur: 1991–1993
- Muhammad Haji Ibrahim Egal: 1993–2002
- Dahir Riyale Kahin: 2002–2010
- Ahmed Mohamed Mohamoud: 2010–2017
- Muse Bihi Abdi: 2017–2024
- Abdirahman Mohamed Abdullahi: 2024–

== Government and politics of Somaliland ==
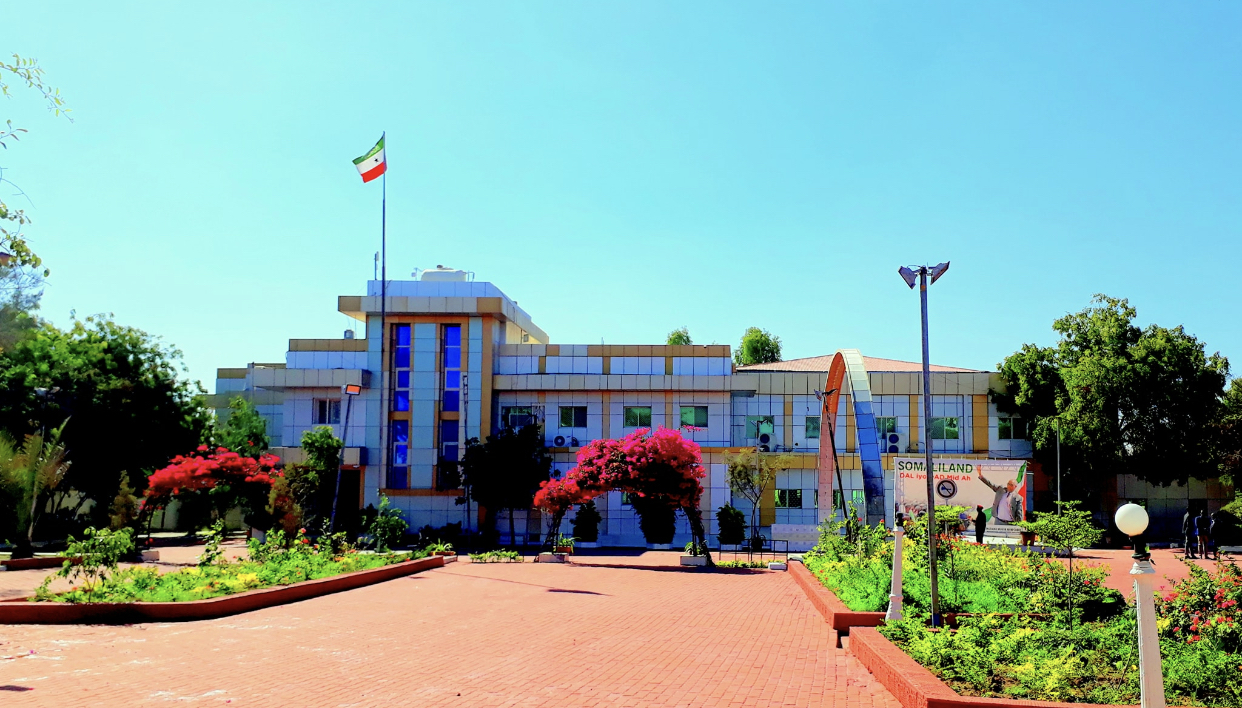
Somaliland Presidential Palace - Qasriga Madaxtooyada JSL

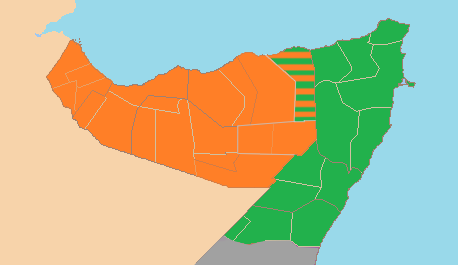
Dispute updated as of December 2016

Politics of Somaliland

- Form of government:
- Capital of Somaliland: Hargeisa
- Elections in Somaliland
- Political parties in Somaliland

=== Branches of the government of Somaliland ===
Government of Somaliland

==== Executive branch of the government of Somaliland ====
- Head of state and head of government, 6th President of Somaliland, Abdirahman Mohamed Abdullahi
  - 6th Vice President of Somaliland, Mohamed Aw-Ali Abdi
- Cabinet of Somaliland

==== Legislative branch of the government of Somaliland ====
- Parliament of Somaliland (bicameral)

==== Judicial branch of the government of Somaliland ====
Judiciary of Somaliland

=== Foreign relations of Somaliland ===
Foreign relations of Somaliland

- Diplomatic missions in Somaliland
- Diplomatic missions of Somaliland

==== International organization membership ====
- None

=== Law and order in Somaliland ===
Judiciary of Somaliland

- Alcohol in Somaliland
- Cannabis in Somaliland
- Capital punishment in Somaliland
- Constitution of Somaliland
- Crime in Somaliland
  - Kidnapping and hostage taking in Somaliland
- Human rights in Somaliland
  - LGBT rights in Somaliland
- Law enforcement in Somaliland
- Marriage in Somaliland
  - Polygamy in Somaliland
- Xeer

=== Military of Somaliland ===
Military of Somaliland

- Command
  - Commander-in-chief: Nuh Ismail Tani
    - Ministry of Defence of Somaliland
- Forces
  - Army of Somaliland
  - Navy of Somaliland
  - National Intelligence Agency (Somaliland)

=== Local government in Somaliland ===
Local government in Somaliland

== History of Somaliland ==
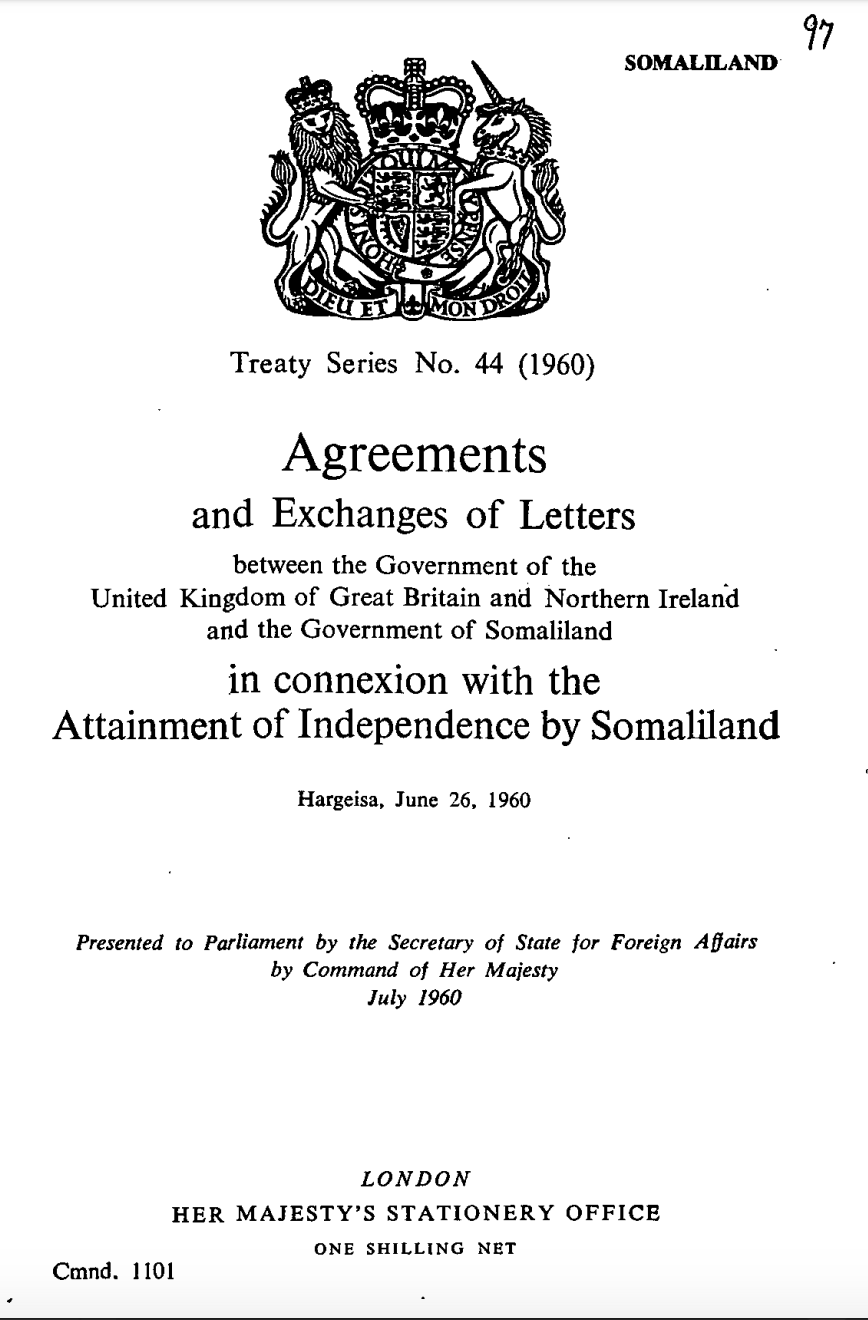
Agreements and Exchanges of Letters between the Government of the United Kingdom of Great Britain and Northern Ireland and the Government of Somaliland in connexion with the Attainment of Independence by Somaliland

History of Somaliland

- Isaaq Sultanate
- State of Somaliland
- Somaliland Declaration of Independence
- 2001 Somaliland constitutional referendum
- Current events of Somaliland
- Puntland–Somaliland dispute

== Culture of Somaliland ==
Culture of Somaliland

- Architecture of Somaliland
- Cuisine of Somaliland
- Languages of Somaliland
- Media in Somaliland
- National symbols of Somaliland
  - Coat of arms of Somaliland
  - Flag of Somaliland
  - National anthem of Somaliland
- Public holidays in Somaliland
- Religion in Somaliland
  - Islam in Somaliland
  - Christianity in Somaliland
    - Roman Catholicism in Somaliland

=== Art in Somaliland ===
- Somali art
- Cinema of Somaliland
  - Somaliwood
- Literature of Somaliland
- Music of Somaliland

=== Sports in Somaliland ===
Sports in Somaliland

- Somaliland national football team
- Somaliland League
- Somaliland Cup
- Somaliland Football
- Somaliland national basketball team

== Economy and infrastructure of Somaliland ==
Economy of Somaliland

- Agriculture in Somalia
- Banking in Somaliland
  - Bank of Somaliland
- Communications in Somaliland
  - Internet in Somaliland
- Companies of Somaliland
- Currency of Somaliland: Shilling
  - ISO 4217: None
- Economic history of Somaliland
- Energy in Somaliland
- Health care in Somaliland
- Mining in Somaliland
- Somaliland Stock Exchange
- Tourism in Somaliland
- Telecommunications in Somaliland
- Transport in Somaliland
  - Airports in Somaliland

== Education in Somaliland ==
Education in Somaliland

- National Library of Somaliland
- Universities in Somaliland

== See also ==
Wikimedia Atlas of Somaliland

Somaliland

- List of international rankings
- List of Somaliland-related topics
- Outline of Africa
- Outline of geography
