= List of birds of Somaliland =

This is a list of the bird species recorded in Somaliland. The avifauna of Somaliland include a total of 725 species, of which seven are endemic, one has been introduced by humans and one is rare or accidental. Fourteen species are globally threatened.

This list's taxonomic treatment (designation and sequence of orders, families and species) and nomenclature (common and scientific names) follow the conventions of The Clements Checklist of Birds of the World, 6th edition. The family accounts at the beginning of each heading reflect this taxonomy, as do the species counts found in each family account. Introduced and accidental species are included in the total counts for Somaliland.

The following tags have been used to highlight several categories, but not all species fall into one of these categories. Those that do not are commonly occurring native species.

- (A) Accidental - a species that rarely or accidentally occurs in Somaliland
- (E) Endemic - a species endemic to Somaliland
- (I) Introduced - a species introduced to Somaliland as a consequence, direct or indirect, of human actions

== Ostriches ==
Order: Struthioniformes Family: Struthionidae

The ostrich is a flightless bird native to Africa. It is the largest living species of bird. It is distinctive in its appearance, with a long neck and legs and the ability to run at high speeds.

- Somali ostrich, Struthio molybdophanes

== Grebes ==
Order: Podicipediformes Family: Podicipedidae

Grebes are small to medium-large freshwater diving birds. They have lobed toes and are excellent swimmers and divers. However, they have their feet placed far back on the body, making them quite ungainly on land. There are 20 species worldwide and 2 species which occur in Somaliland.

- Little grebe, Tachybaptus ruficollis
- Eared grebe, Podiceps nigricollis

== Albatrosses ==
Order: Procellariiformes Family: Diomedeidae

The albatrosses are among the largest of flying birds, and the great albatrosses from the genus Diomedea have the largest wingspans of any extant birds. There are 21 species worldwide and 1 species which occurs in Somaliland.

- Shy albatross, Thalassarche cauta (A)

== Shearwaters and petrels ==
Order: Procellariiformes Family: Procellariidae

The procellariids are the main group of medium-sized "true petrels", characterised by united nostrils with medium septum and a long outer functional primary.

- Cape petrel, Daption capense
- Mascarene petrel, Pterodroma aterrima
- Antarctic prion, Pachyptila desolata
- Jouanin's petrel, Bulweria fallax
- Kerguelen petrel, Aphrodroma brevirostris
- Flesh-footed shearwater, Ardenna carneipes
- Wedge-tailed shearwater, Ardenna pacificus
- Persian shearwater, Puffinus persicus
- Tropical shearwater, Puffinus bailloni

== Austral storm petrels ==
Order: Procellariiformes Family: Oceanitidae

The austral storm petrels are relatives of the petrels and are the smallest seabirds. They feed on planktonic crustaceans and small fish picked from the surface, typically while hovering. The flight is fluttering and sometimes bat-like.

- Wilson's storm petrel, Oceanites oceanicus
- White-faced storm petrel, Pelagodroma marina
- Black-bellied storm petrel, Fregetta tropica

== Northern storm petrels ==
Order: Procellariiformes Family: Hydrobatidae

- Swinhoe's storm petrel, Oceanodroma monorhis
- Matsudaira's storm petrel, Oceanodroma matsudairae

== Tropicbirds ==
Order: Phaethontiformes Family: Phaethontidae

Tropicbirds are slender white birds of tropical oceans, with exceptionally long central tail feathers. Their heads and long wings have black markings.

- Red-billed tropicbird, Phaethon aethereus

== Boobies and gannets ==
Order: Suliformes Family: Sulidae

The sulids comprise the gannets and boobies. Both groups are medium to large coastal seabirds that plunge-dive for fish.

- Masked booby, Sula dactylatra
- Red-footed booby, Sula sula
- Brown booby, Sula leucogaster

== Cormorants ==
Order: Suliformes Family: Phalacrocoracidae

Phalacrocoracidae is a family of medium to large coastal, fish-eating seabirds that includes cormorants and shags. Plumage colouration varies, with the majority having mainly dark plumage, some species being black-and-white and a few being colourful.

- Great cormorant, Phalacrocorax carbo
- Socotra cormorant, Phalacrocorax nigrogularis
- Long-tailed cormorant, Microcarbo africanus

== Darters ==
Order: Suliformes Family: Anhingidae

Darters are often called "snake-birds" because of their long thin neck, which gives a snake-like appearance when they swim with their bodies submerged. The males have black and dark-brown plumage, an erectile crest on the nape and a larger bill than the female. The females have much paler plumage especially on the neck and underparts. The darters have completely webbed feet and their legs are short and set far back on the body. Their plumage is somewhat permeable, like that of cormorants, and they spread their wings to dry after diving.

- African darter, Anhinga melanogaster

== Frigatebirds ==
Order: Suliformes Family: Fregatidae

Frigatebirds are large seabirds usually found over tropical oceans. They are large, black-and-white or completely black, with long wings and deeply forked tails. The males have coloured inflatable throat pouches. They do not swim or walk and cannot take off from a flat surface. Having the largest wingspan-to-body-weight ratio of any bird, they are essentially aerial, able to stay aloft for more than a week.

- Great frigatebird, Fregata minor
- Lesser frigatebird, Fregata ariel

== Pelicans ==
Order: Pelecaniformes Family: Pelecanidae

Pelicans are large water birds with a distinctive pouch under their beak. As with other members of the order Pelecaniformes, they have webbed feet with four toes.

- Great white pelican, Pelecanus onocrotalus
- Pink-backed pelican, Pelecanus rufescens

== Bitterns, herons and egrets ==
Order: Pelecaniformes Family: Ardeidae

The family Ardeidae contains the bitterns, herons and egrets. Herons and egrets are medium to large wading birds with long necks and legs. Bitterns tend to be shorter necked and more wary. Members of Ardeidae fly with their necks retracted, unlike other long-necked birds such as storks, ibises and spoonbills.

- Grey heron, Ardea cinerea
- Black-headed heron, Ardea melanocephala
- Goliath heron, Ardea goliath
- Purple heron, Ardea purpurea
- Great egret, Ardea alba
- Intermediate egret, Ardea intermedia
- Black heron, Egretta ardesiaca
- Western reef heron, Egretta gularis
- Little egret, Egretta garzetta
- Squacco heron, Ardeola ralloides
- Madagascar pond heron, Ardeola idae
- Cattle egret, Bubulcus ibis
- Striated heron, Butorides striata
- Black-crowned night heron, Nycticorax nycticorax
- Dwarf bittern, Ixobrychus sturmii

== Hammerkop ==
Order: Pelecaniformes Family: Scopidae

The hammerkop is a medium-sized bird with a long shaggy crest. The shape of its head with a curved bill and crest at the back is reminiscent of a hammer, hence its name. Its plumage is drab-brown all over.

- Hamerkop, Scopus umbretta

== Ibises and spoonbills ==
Order: Pelecaniformes Family: Threskiornithidae

Threskiornithidae is a family of large terrestrial and wading birds which includes the ibises and spoonbills. They have long, broad wings with 11 primary and about 20 secondary feathers. They are strong fliers and despite their size and weight, very capable soarers.

- Sacred ibis, Threskiornis aethiopicus
- Waldrapp, Geronticus eremita
- Hadada ibis, Bostrychia hagedash
- Glossy ibis, Plegadis falcinellus
- Eurasian spoonbill, Platalea leucorodia
- African spoonbill, Platalea alba

== Storks ==
Order: Ciconiiformes Family: Ciconiidae

Storks are large, long-legged, long-necked, wading birds with long, stout bills. Storks are mute, but bill-clattering is an important mode of communication at the nest. Their nests can be large and may be reused for many years. Many species are migratory.

- Yellow-billed stork, Mycteria ibis
- African openbill, Anastomus lamelligerus
- Black stork, Ciconia nigra
- Abdim's stork, Ciconia abdimii
- African woolly-necked stork, Ciconia microscelis
- White stork, Ciconia ciconia
- Saddle-billed stork, Ephippiorhynchus senegalensis
- Marabou stork, Leptoptilos crumenifer

== Flamingos ==
Order: Phoenicopteriformes Family: Phoenicopteridae

Flamingos are gregarious wading birds, usually 3 to 5 feet (0.9 to 1.5 m) tall, found in both the Western and Eastern Hemispheres. Flamingos filter-feed on shellfish and algae. Their oddly shaped beaks are specially adapted to separate mud and silt from the food they consume and, uniquely, are used upside-down. There are 6 species worldwide and 2 species which occur in Somaliland.

- Greater flamingo, Phoenicopterus roseus
- Lesser flamingo, Phoenicopterus minor

== Ducks, geese and swans ==
Order: Anseriformes Family: Anatidae

Anatidae includes the ducks and most duck-like waterfowl, such as geese and swans. These birds are adapted to an aquatic existence with webbed feet, flattened bills, and feathers that are excellent at shedding water due to an oily coating.

- Fulvous whistling duck, Dendrocygna bicolor
- White-faced whistling duck, Dendrocygna viduata
- White-backed duck, Thalassornis leuconotus
- Egyptian goose, Alopochen aegyptiacus
- Ruddy shelduck, Tadorna ferruginea
- Knob-billed duck, Sarkidiornis melanotos
- African pygmy goose, Nettapus auritus
- Eurasian wigeon, Mareca penelope
- Gadwall, Mareca strepera
- Green-winged teal, Anas crecca
- Yellow-billed duck, Anas undulata
- Northern pintail, Anas acuta
- Red-billed duck, Anas erythrorhyncha
- Hottentot teal, Spatula hottentota
- Garganey, Spatula querquedula
- Northern shoveler, Spatula clypeata
- Southern pochard, Netta erythrophthalma
- Tufted duck, Aythya fuligula

== Osprey ==
Order: Accipitriformes Family: Pandionidae

The family Pandionidae contains only one species, the osprey. The osprey is a medium-large raptor which is a specialist fish-eater with a worldwide distribution.

- Osprey, Pandion haliaetus

== Hawks, kites and eagles ==
Order: Accipitriformes Family: Accipitridae

Accipitridae is a family of birds of prey, which includes hawks, eagles, kites, harriers and Old World vultures. These birds have powerful hooked beaks for tearing flesh from their prey, strong legs, powerful talons and keen eyesight.

- African cuckoo hawk, Aviceda cuculoides
- European honey buzzard, Pernis apivorus
- Bat hawk, Macheiramphus alcinus
- Black-winged kite, Elanus caeruleus
- Scissor-tailed kite, Chelictinia riocourii
- Yellow-billed kite, Milvus aegyptius
- African fish eagle, Haliaeetus vocifer
- Hooded vulture, Necrosyrtes monachus
- Lammergeier, Gypaetus barbatus
- Egyptian vulture, Neophron percnopterus
- White-backed vulture, Gyps africanus
- Rüppell's vulture, Gyps rueppelli
- Eurasian griffon, Gyps fulvus
- Lappet-faced vulture, Torgos tracheliotos
- White-headed vulture, Trigonoceps occipitalis
- Black-breasted snake eagle, Circaetus pectoralis
- Brown snake eagle, Circaetus cinereus
- Fasciated snake eagle, Circaetus fasciolatus
- Bateleur, Terathopius ecaudatus
- Western marsh harrier, Circus aeruginosus
- African marsh harrier, Circus ranivorus
- Pallid harrier, Circus macrourus
- Montagu's harrier, Circus pygargus
- African harrier-hawk, Polyboroides typus
- Lizard buzzard, Kaupifalco monogrammicus
- Dark chanting goshawk, Melierax metabates
- Eastern chanting goshawk, Melierax poliopterus
- Gabar goshawk, Micronisus gabar
- African goshawk, Accipiter tachiro
- Shikra, Accipiter badius
- Little sparrowhawk, Accipiter minullus
- Eurasian sparrowhawk, Accipiter nisus
- Black goshawk, Accipiter melanoleucus
- Grasshopper buzzard, Butastur rufipennis
- Eurasian buzzard, Buteo buteo
- Long-legged buzzard, Buteo rufinus
- Augur buzzard, Buteo augur
- Tawny eagle, Aquila rapax
- Steppe eagle, Aquila nipalensis
- Verreaux's eagle, Aquila verreauxii
- African hawk-eagle, Aquila spilogaster
- Wahlberg's eagle, Hieraaetus wahlbergi
- Booted eagle, Hieraaetus pennatus
- Ayres's hawk-eagle, Hieraaetus ayresii
- Martial eagle, Polemaetus bellicosus
- Long-crested eagle, Lophaetus occipitalis

== Secretarybird ==
Order: Accipitriformes Family: Sagittariidae

The secretarybird is a bird of prey in the order Falconiformes but is easily distinguished from other raptors by its long crane-like legs.

- Secretarybird, Sagittarius serpentarius

== Caracaras and falcons ==
Order: Falconiformes Family: Falconidae

Falconidae is a family of diurnal birds of prey. They differ from hawks, eagles and kites in that they kill with their beaks instead of their talons. There are 62 species worldwide and 14 species which occur in Somaliland.

- Pygmy falcon, Polihierax semitorquatus
- Lesser kestrel, Falco naumanni
- Eurasian kestrel, Falco tinnunculus
- Greater kestrel, Falco rupicoloides
- Red-necked falcon, Falco chicquera
- Red-footed falcon, Falco vespertinus
- Amur falcon, Falco amurensis
- Eleonora's falcon, Falco eleonorae
- Sooty falcon, Falco concolor
- Eurasian hobby, Falco subbuteo
- African hobby, Falco cuvierii
- Lanner falcon, Falco biarmicus
- Barbary falcon, Falco pelegrinoides
- Peregrine falcon, Falco peregrinus

== Pheasants and partridges ==
Order: Galliformes Family: Phasianidae

The Phasianidae are a family of terrestrial birds which consists of quails, partridges, snowcocks, francolins, spurfowls, tragopans, monals, pheasants, peafowls and jungle fowls. In general, they are plump (although they vary in size) and have broad, relatively short wings. There are 7 species which have been recorded in Somaliland.

- Crested francolin, Dendroperdix sephaena
- Moorland francolin, Scleroptila psilolaemus
- Orange River francolin, Scleroptila gutturalis
- Yellow-necked spurfowl, Pternistis leucoscepus
- Red-necked spurfowl, Pternistis afer
- Chestnut-naped francolin, Pternistis castaneicollis
- Harlequin quail, Coturnix delegorguei

== Guineafowl ==
Order: Galliformes Family: Numididae

Guineafowl are a group of African, seed-eating, ground-nesting birds that resemble partridges, but with featherless heads and spangled grey plumage. There are 6 species worldwide and 3 species which occur in Somaliland.

- Helmeted guineafowl, Numida meleagris
- Crested guineafowl, Guttera pucherani
- Vulturine guineafowl, Acryllium vulturinum

== Flufftails ==
Order: Gruiformes Family: Sarothruridae

- Buff-spotted flufftail, Sarothrura elegans

== Rails, crakes, gallinules and coots ==
Order: Gruiformes Family: Rallidae

Rallidae is a large family of small to medium-sized birds which includes the rails, crakes, coots and gallinules. Typically they inhabit dense vegetation in damp environments near lakes, swamps or rivers. In general they are shy and secretive birds, making them difficult to observe. Most species have strong legs and long toes which are well adapted to soft uneven surfaces. They tend to have short, rounded wings and to be weak fliers. There are 10 species which occur in Somaliland.

- Corn crake, Crex crex
- Black crake, Amaurornis flavirostris
- Little crake, Porzana parva
- Baillon's crake, Porzana pusilla
- Spotted crake, Porzana porzana
- African swamphen, Porphyrio madagascariensis
- Allen's gallinule, Porphyrio alleni
- Common moorhen, Gallinula chloropus
- Lesser moorhen, Gallinula angulata
- Red-knobbed coot, Fulica cristata

== Sungrebe and finfoots ==
Order: Gruiformes Family: Heliornithidae

Heliornithidae is a small family of tropical birds with webbed lobes on their feet similar to those of grebes and coots. There are 3 species worldwide and 1 species which occurs in Somaliland.

- African finfoot, Podica senegalensis

== Bustards ==
Order: Otidiformes Family: Otididae

Bustards are large terrestrial birds mainly associated with dry open country and steppes in the Old World. They are omnivorous and nest on the ground. They walk steadily on strong legs and big toes, pecking for food as they go. They have long broad wings with "fingered" wingtips and striking patterns in flight. Many have interesting mating displays.

- Arabian bustard, Ardeotis arabs
- Kori bustard, Ardeotis kori
- Heuglin's bustard, Neotis heuglinii
- White-bellied bustard, Eupodotis senegalensis
- Little brown bustard, Eupodotis humilis
- Buff-crested bustard, Lophotis gindiana
- Black-bellied bustard, Lissotis melanogaster
- Hartlaub's bustard, Lissotis hartlaubii

== Jacanas ==
Order: Charadriiformes Family: Jacanidae

The jacanas are a group of tropical waders in the family Jacanidae. They are found throughout the tropics. They are identifiable by their huge feet and claws which enable them to walk on floating vegetation in the shallow lakes that are their preferred habitat. There 8 species worldwide and 1 species which occurs in Somaliland.

- African jacana, Actophilornis africanus

== Buttonquails ==
Order: Charadriiformes Family: Turnicidae

The buttonquails are small, drab, running birds which resemble the true quails. The female is the brighter of the sexes and initiates courtship. The male incubates the eggs and tends the young.

- Small buttonquail, Turnix sylvatica

== Painted-snipe ==
Order: Charadriiformes Family: Rostratulidae

Painted-snipe are short-legged, long-billed birds similar in shape to the true snipes, but more brightly coloured. There are 2 species worldwide and 1 species which occurs in Somaliland.

- Greater painted-snipe, Rostratula benghalensis

== Crab-plover ==
Order: Charadriiformes Family: Dromadidae

The crab-plover is related to the waders. It resembles a plover but with very long grey legs and a strong heavy black bill similar to a tern. It has black-and-white plumage, a long neck, partially webbed feet and a bill designed for eating crabs.

- Crab-plover, Dromas ardeola

== Oystercatchers ==
Order: Charadriiformes Family: Haematopodidae

The oystercatchers are large and noisy plover-like birds, with strong bills used for smashing or prising open molluscs. There are 11 species worldwide and 1 species which occurs in Somaliland.

- Eurasian oystercatcher, Haematopus ostralegus

== Avocets and stilts ==
Order: Charadriiformes Family: Recurvirostridae

Recurvirostridae is a family of large wading birds, which includes the avocets and stilts. The avocets have long legs and long up-curved bills. The stilts have extremely long legs and long, thin, straight bills. There are 9 species worldwide and 2 species which occur in Somaliland.

- Black-winged stilt, Himantopus himantopus
- Pied avocet, Recurvirostra avosetta

== Thick-knees ==
Order: Charadriiformes Family: Burhinidae

The thick-knees are a group of largely tropical waders in the family Burhinidae. They are found worldwide within the tropical zone, with some species also breeding in temperate Europe and Australia. They are medium to large waders with strong black or yellow-black bills, large yellow eyes and cryptic plumage. Despite being classed as waders, most species have a preference for arid or semi-arid habitats. There are 9 species worldwide and 3 species which occur in Somaliland.

- Water thick-knee, Burhinus vermiculatus
- Eurasian thick-knee, Burhinus oedicnemus
- Spotted thick-knee, Burhinus capensis

== Pratincoles and coursers ==
Order: Charadriiformes Family: Glareolidae

Glareolidae is a family of wading birds comprising the pratincoles, which have short legs, long pointed wings and long forked tails, and the coursers, which have long legs, short wings and long, pointed bills which curve downwards. There are 8 species which occur in Somaliland.

- Cream-colored courser, Cursorius cursor
- Temminck's courser, Cursorius temminckii
- Double-banded courser, Smutsornis africanus
- Three-banded courser, Rhinoptilus cinctus
- Bronze-winged courser, Rhinoptilus chalcopterus
- Collared pratincole, Glareola pratincola
- Black-winged pratincole, Glareola nordmanni
- Madagascar pratincole, Glareola ocularis

== Plovers and lapwings ==
Order: Charadriiformes Family: Charadriidae

The family Charadriidae includes the plovers, dotterels and lapwings. They are small to medium-sized birds with compact bodies, short, thick necks and long, usually pointed, wings. They are found in open country worldwide, mostly in habitats near water. There are 66 species worldwide and 19 species which occur in Somaliland.

- Spur-winged plover, Vanellus spinosus
- Black-headed lapwing, Vanellus tectus
- Senegal lapwing, Vanellus lugubris
- Black-winged lapwing, Vanellus melanopterus
- Crowned lapwing, Vanellus coronatus
- Wattled lapwing, Vanellus senegallus
- Sociable lapwing, Vanellus gregarius
- Pacific golden-plover, Pluvialis fulva
- European golden-plover, Pluvialis apricaria
- Black-bellied plover, Pluvialis squatarola
- Common ringed plover, Charadrius hiaticula
- Little ringed plover, Charadrius dubius
- Kittlitz's plover, Charadrius pecuarius
- Three-banded plover, Charadrius tricollaris
- White-fronted plover, Charadrius marginatus
- Snowy plover, Charadrius alexandrinus
- Lesser sandplover, Charadrius mongolus
- Greater sandplover, Charadrius leschenaultii
- Caspian plover, Charadrius asiaticus

== Sandpipers and allies ==
Order: Charadriiformes Family: Scolopacidae

Scolopacidae is a large diverse family of small to medium-sized shorebirds including the sandpipers, curlews, godwits, shanks, tattlers, woodcocks, snipes, dowitchers and phalaropes. The majority of these species eat small invertebrates picked out of the mud or soil. Variation in length of legs and bills enables multiple species to feed in the same habitat, particularly on the coast, without direct competition for food. There are 28 species which occur in Somaliland.

- Jack snipe, Lymnocryptes minimus
- Pintail snipe, Gallinago stenura
- Great snipe, Gallinago media
- Common snipe, Gallinago gallinago
- Black-tailed godwit, Limosa limosa
- Bar-tailed godwit, Limosa lapponica
- Whimbrel, Numenius phaeopus
- Slender-billed curlew, Numenius tenuirostris
- Eurasian curlew, Numenius arquata
- Spotted redshank, Tringa erythropus
- Common redshank, Tringa totanus
- Marsh sandpiper, Tringa stagnatilis
- Common greenshank, Tringa nebularia
- Green sandpiper, Tringa ochropus
- Wood sandpiper, Tringa glareola
- Terek sandpiper, Xenus cinereus
- Common sandpiper, Actitis hypoleucos
- Ruddy turnstone, Arenaria interpres
- Red knot, Calidris canutus
- Sanderling, Calidris alba
- Red-necked stint, Calidris ruficollis
- Little stint, Calidris minuta
- Temminck's stint, Calidris temminckii
- Curlew sandpiper, Calidris ferruginea
- Dunlin, Calidris alpina
- Broad-billed sandpiper, Calidris falcinellus
- Ruff, Calidris pugnax
- Red-necked phalarope, Phalaropus lobatus

== Skuas and jaegers ==
Order: Charadriiformes Family: Stercorariidae

The family Stercorariidae are, in general, medium to large birds, typically with grey or brown plumage, often with white markings on the wings. They nest on the ground in temperate and arctic regions and are long-distance migrants. There are 7 species worldwide and 4 species which occur in Somaliland.

- South polar skua, Stercorarius maccormicki
- Brown skua, Stercorarius antarctica
- Pomarine jaeger, Stercorarius pomarinus
- Parasitic jaeger, Stercorarius parasiticus

== Gulls, terns, and skimmers ==
Order: Charadriiformes Family: Laridae

Laridae is a family of medium to large seabirds, the gulls, terns, and skimmers. Gulls are typically grey or white, often with black markings on the head or wings. They have stout, longish bills and webbed feet. Terns are a group of generally medium to large seabirds typically with grey or white plumage, often with black markings on the head. Most terns hunt fish by diving but some pick insects off the surface of fresh water. Terns are generally long-lived birds, with several species known to live in excess of 30 years. Skimmers are a small family of tropical tern-like birds. They have an elongated lower mandible which they use to feed by flying low over the water surface and skimming the water for small fish.

- White-eyed gull, Ichthyaetus leucophthalmus
- Sooty gull, Ichthyaetus hemprichii
- Pallas's gull, Ichthyaetus ichthyaetus
- Grey-headed gull, Chroicocephalus cirrocephalus
- Black-headed gull, Chroicocephalus ridibundus
- Sabine's gull, Xema sabini
- Herring gull, Larus argentatus
- Lesser black-backed gull, Larus fuscus
- Heuglin's gull, Larus heuglini
- Caspian gull, Larus cachinnans
- Armenian gull, Larus armenicus
- Gull-billed tern, Gelochelidon nilotica
- Caspian tern, Hydroprogne caspia
- Lesser crested tern, Thalasseus bengalensis
- Sandwich tern, Thalasseus sandvicensis
- Great crested tern, Thalasseus bergii
- Roseate tern, Sterna dougallii
- Common tern, Sterna hirundo
- Arctic tern, Sterna paradisaea
- White-cheeked tern, Sterna repressa
- Little tern, Sternula albifrons
- Saunders's tern, Sternula saundersi
- Bridled tern, Onychoprion anaethetus
- Sooty tern, Onychoprion fuscatus
- Whiskered tern, Chlidonias hybrida
- White-winged tern, Chlidonias leucopterus
- Black tern, Chlidonias niger
- Lesser noddy, Anous tenuirostris
- Brown noddy, Anous stolidus
- African skimmer, Rynchops flavirostris

== Sandgrouse ==
Order: Pterocliformes Family: Pteroclidae

Sandgrouse have small, pigeon like heads and necks, but sturdy compact bodies. They have long pointed wings and sometimes tails and a fast direct flight. Flocks fly to watering holes at dawn and dusk. Their legs are feathered down to the toes. There are 16 species worldwide and 4 species which occur in Somaliland.

- Chestnut-bellied sandgrouse, Pterocles exustus
- Spotted sandgrouse, Pterocles senegallus
- Black-faced sandgrouse, Pterocles decoratus
- Lichtenstein's sandgrouse, Pterocles lichtensteinii

== Pigeons and doves ==
Order: Columbiformes Family: Columbidae

Pigeons and doves are stout-bodied birds with short necks and short slender bills with a fleshy cere.

- Rock pigeon, Columba livia
- Speckled pigeon, Columba guinea
- White-collared pigeon, Columba albitorques
- Somali pigeon, Columba oliviae (E)
- Rameron pigeon, Columba arquatrix
- European turtle dove, Streptopelia turtur
- Dusky turtle dove, Streptopelia lugens
- African collared dove, Streptopelia roseogrisea
- White-winged collared dove, Streptopelia reichenowi
- African mourning dove, Streptopelia decipiens
- Red-eyed dove, Streptopelia semitorquata
- Ring-necked dove, Streptopelia capicola
- Laughing dove, Spilopelia senegalensis
- Emerald-spotted wood dove, Turtur chalcospilos
- Tambourine dove, Turtur tympanistria
- Namaqua dove, Oena capensis
- Bruce's green pigeon, Treron waalia

== Old World parrots ==
Order: Psittaciformes Family: Psittaculidae

- Rose-ringed parakeet, Psittacula krameri

== African and New World parrots ==
Order: Psittaciformes Family: Psittacidae

- Brown-headed parrot, Poicephalus cryptoxanthus
- Red-bellied parrot, Poicephalus rufiventris

== Turacos ==
Order: Cuculiformes Family: Musophagidae

The turacos, plantain eaters and go-away-birds make up the bird family Musophagidae. They are medium-sized arboreal birds. The turacos and plantain eaters are brightly coloured, usually in blue, green or purple. The go-away birds are mostly grey and white. There are 23 species worldwide and 3 species which occur in Somaliland.

- Fischer's turaco, Tauraco fischeri
- White-cheeked turaco, Tauraco leucotis
- White-bellied go-away-bird, Corythaixoides leucogaster

== Cuckoos and anis ==
Order: Cuculiformes Family: Cuculidae

The family Cuculidae includes cuckoos, roadrunners and anis. These birds are of variable size with slender bodies, long tails and strong legs. The Old World cuckoos are brood parasites. There are 138 species worldwide and 14 species which occur in Somaliland.

- Pied cuckoo, Clamator jacobinus
- Levaillant's cuckoo, Clamator levaillantii
- Great spotted cuckoo, Clamator glandarius
- Red-chested cuckoo, Cuculus solitarius
- Black cuckoo, Cuculus clamosus
- Common cuckoo, Cuculus canorus
- African cuckoo, Cuculus gularis
- Lesser cuckoo, Cuculus poliocephalus
- Klaas's cuckoo, Chrysococcyx klaas
- African emerald cuckoo, Chrysococcyx cupreus
- Dideric cuckoo, Chrysococcyx caprius
- Green malkoha, Ceuthmochares australis
- Senegal coucal, Centropus senegalensis
- White-browed coucal, Centropus superciliosus

== Barn owls ==
Order: Strigiformes Family: Tytonidae

Barn owls are medium to large owls with large heads and characteristic heart-shaped faces. They have long strong legs with powerful talons. There are 16 species worldwide and 1 species which occurs in Somaliland.

- Barn owl, Tyto alba

== Typical owls ==
Order: Strigiformes Family: Strigidae

The typical owls are small to large solitary nocturnal birds of prey. They have large forward-facing eyes and ears, a hawk-like beak and a conspicuous circle of feathers around each eye called a facial disk.

- African scops-owl, Otus senegalensis
- Eurasian scops-owl, Otus scops
- Northern white-faced owl, Ptilopsis leucotis
- Southern white-faced owl, Ptilopsis granti
- Spotted eagle-owl, Bubo africanus
- Greyish eagle-owl, Bubo cinerascens
- Verreaux's eagle-owl, Bubo lacteus
- Pel's fishing-owl, Scotopelia peli
- African wood-owl, Strix woodfordii
- Pearl-spotted owlet, Glaucidium perlatum
- African barred owlet, Glaucidium capense
- Little owl, Athene noctua
- Short-eared owl, Asio flammeus

== Nightjars ==
Order: Caprimulgiformes Family: Caprimulgidae

Nightjars are medium-sized nocturnal birds that usually nest on the ground. They have long wings, short legs and very short bills. Most have small feet, of little use for walking, and long pointed wings. Their soft plumage is camouflaged to resemble bark or leaves. There are 13 species which have been recorded in Somaliland.

- Eurasian nightjar, Caprimulgus europaeus
- Sombre nightjar, Caprimulgus fraenatus
- Egyptian nightjar, Caprimulgus aegyptius
- Nubian nightjar, Caprimulgus nubicus
- Donaldson-Smith's nightjar, Caprimulgus donaldsoni
- Fiery-necked nightjar, Caprimulgus pectoralis
- Plain nightjar, Caprimulgus inornatus
- Star-spotted nightjar, Caprimulgus stellatus
- Long-tailed nightjar, Caprimulgus climacurus
- Slender-tailed nightjar, Caprimulgus clarus
- Square-tailed nightjar, Caprimulgus fossii
- Pennant-winged nightjar, Caprimulgus vexillarius
- Standard-winged nightjar, Caprimulgus longipennis

== Swifts ==
Order: Caprimulgiformes Family: Apodidae

Swifts are small birds which spend the majority of their lives flying. These birds have very short legs and never settle voluntarily on the ground, perching instead only on vertical surfaces. Many swifts have long swept-back wings which resemble a crescent or boomerang.

- Mottled spinetail, Telacanthura ussheri
- Bat-like spinetail, Neafrapus boehmi
- African palm-swift, Cypsiurus parvus
- Alpine swift, Tachymarptis melba
- Common swift, Apus apus
- Nyanza swift, Apus niansae
- Pallid swift, Apus pallidus
- Forbes-Watson's swift, Apus berliozi
- Little swift, Apus affinis
- White-rumped swift, Apus caffer

== Mousebirds ==
Order: Coliiformes Family: Coliidae

The mousebirds are slender greyish or brown birds with soft, hairlike body feathers and very long thin tails. They are arboreal and scurry through the leaves like rodents in search of berries, fruit and buds. They are acrobatic and can feed upside down. All species have strong claws and reversible outer toes. They also have crests and stubby bills. There are 6 species worldwide and 3 species which occur in Somaliland.

- Speckled mousebird, Colius striatus
- White-headed mousebird, Colius leucocephalus
- Blue-naped mousebird, Urocolius macrourus

== Trogons and quetzals ==
Order: Trogoniformes Family: Trogonidae

The family Trogonidae includes trogons and quetzals. Found in tropical woodlands worldwide, they feed on insects and fruit, and their broad bills and weak legs reflect their diet and arboreal habits. Although their flight is fast, they are reluctant to fly any distance. Trogons have soft, often colourful, feathers with distinctive male and female plumage. There are 33 species worldwide and 1 species which occurs in Somaliland.

- Narina trogon, Apaloderma narina

== Kingfishers ==
Order: Coraciiformes Family: Alcedinidae

Kingfishers are medium-sized birds with large heads, long, pointed bills, short legs and stubby tails. There are 93 species worldwide and 10 species which occur in Somaliland.

- Malachite kingfisher, Corythornis cristatus
- African pygmy kingfisher, Ispidina picta
- Grey-headed kingfisher, Halcyon leucocephala
- Woodland kingfisher, Halcyon senegalensis
- Mangrove kingfisher, Halcyon senegaloides
- Brown-hooded kingfisher, Halcyon albiventris
- Striped kingfisher, Halcyon chelicuti
- Collared kingfisher, Todirhamphus chloris
- Giant kingfisher, Megaceryle maximus
- Pied kingfisher, Ceryle rudis

== Bee-eaters ==
Order: Coraciiformes Family: Meropidae

The bee-eaters are a group of near passerine birds in the family Meropidae. Most species are found in Africa but others occur in southern Europe, Madagascar, Australia and New Guinea. They are characterised by richly coloured plumage, slender bodies and usually elongated central tail feathers. All are colourful and have long downturned bills and pointed wings, which give them a swallow-like appearance when seen from afar. There are 26 species worldwide and 8 species which occur in Somaliland.

- Little bee-eater, Merops pusillus
- Cinnamon-chested bee-eater, Merops oreobates
- Somali bee-eater, Merops revoilii
- White-throated bee-eater, Merops albicollis
- Blue-cheeked bee-eater, Merops persicus
- Madagascar bee-eater, Merops superciliosus
- European bee-eater, Merops apiaster
- Northern carmine bee-eater, Merops nubicus

== Typical rollers ==
Order: Coraciiformes Family: Coraciidae

Rollers resemble crows in size and build, but are more closely related to the kingfishers and bee-eaters. They share the colourful appearance of those groups with blues and browns predominating. The two inner front toes are connected, but the outer toe is not. There are 12 species worldwide and 5 species which occur in Somaliland.

- European roller, Coracias garrulus
- Abyssinian roller, Coracias abyssinica
- Lilac-breasted roller, Coracias caudata
- Rufous-crowned roller, Coracias naevia
- Broad-billed roller, Eurystomus glaucurus

== Hoopoes ==
Order: Bucerotiformes Family: Upupidae

Hoopoes have black, white and orangey-pink colouring with a large erectile crest on their head. There are 2 species worldwide and 1 species which occurs in Somaliland.

- Hoopoe, Upupa epops

== Woodhoopoes ==
Order: Bucerotiformes Family: Phoeniculidae

The woodhoopoes are related to the kingfishers, rollers and hoopoes. They most resemble the hoopoes with their long curved bills, used to probe for insects, and short rounded wings. However, they differ in that they have metallic plumage, often blue, green or purple, and lack an erectile crest. There are 8 species worldwide and 5 species which occur in Somaliland.

- Green woodhoopoe, Phoeniculus purpureus
- Black-billed woodhoopoe, Phoeniculus somaliensis
- Black scimitar-bill, Rhinopomastus aterrimus
- Common scimitar-bill, Rhinopomastus cyanomelas
- Abyssinian scimitar-bill, Rhinopomastus minor

== Hornbills ==
Order: Bucerotiformes Family: Bucerotidae

Hornbills are a group of birds whose bill is shaped like a cow's horn, but without a twist, sometimes with a casque on the upper mandible. Frequently, the bill is brightly coloured.

- Northern red-billed hornbill, Tockus erythrorhynchus
- Eastern yellow-billed hornbill, Tockus flavirostris
- Von der Decken's hornbill, Tockus deckeni
- Crowned hornbill, Lophoceros alboterminatus
- Hemprich's hornbill, Lophoceros hemprichii
- African grey hornbill, Lophoceros nasutus
- Silvery-cheeked hornbill, Bycanistes brevis

== Ground-hornbills ==
Order: Bucerotiformes Family: Bucorvidae

The ground-hornbills are terrestrial birds which feed almost entirely on insects, other birds, snakes, and amphibians.

- Abyssinian ground-hornbill, Bucorvus abyssinicus

== African barbets ==
Order: Piciformes Family: Lybiidae

The African barbets are plump birds, with short necks and large heads. They get their name from the bristles which fringe their heavy bills. Most species are brightly coloured.

- Red-fronted tinkerbird, Pogoniulus pusillus
- Red-fronted barbet, Tricholaema diademata
- Black-throated barbet, Tricholaema melanocephala
- Brown-breasted barbet, Lybius melanopterus
- Yellow-breasted barbet, Trachyphonus margaritatus
- Red-and-yellow barbet, Trachyphonus erythrocephalus
- D'Arnaud's barbet, Trachyphonus darnaudii

== Honeyguides ==
Order: Piciformes Family: Indicatoridae

Honeyguides are among the few birds that feed on wax. They are named for the greater honeyguide which leads traditional honey-hunters to bees' nests and, after the hunters have harvested the honey, feeds on the remaining contents of the hive. There are 17 species worldwide and 4 species which occur in Somaliland.

- Scaly-throated honeyguide, Indicator variegatus
- Greater honeyguide, Indicator indicator
- Lesser honeyguide, Indicator minor
- Wahlberg's honeyguide, Prodotiscus regulus

== Woodpeckers and allies ==
Order: Piciformes Family: Picidae

Woodpeckers are small to medium-sized birds with chisel-like beaks, short legs, stiff tails and long tongues used for capturing insects. Some species have feet with two toes pointing forward and two backward, while several species have only three toes. Many woodpeckers have the habit of tapping noisily on tree trunks with their beaks.

- Eurasian wryneck, Jynx torquilla
- Nubian woodpecker, Campethera nubica
- Golden-tailed woodpecker, Campethera abingoni
- Mombasa woodpecker, Campethera mombassica
- Green-backed woodpecker, Campethera cailliautii
- Cardinal woodpecker, Dendropicos fuscescens
- Bearded woodpecker, Chloropicus namaquus

== Larks ==
Order: Passeriformes Family: Alaudidae

Larks are small terrestrial birds with often extravagant songs and display flights. Most larks are fairly dull in appearance. Their food is insects and seeds.

- Horsfield's bushlark, Mirafra javanica
- White-tailed lark, Mirafra albicauda
- Red-winged lark, Mirafra hypermetra
- Somali long-billed lark, Mirafra somalica
- Ash's lark, Mirafra ashi (E)
- Rufous-naped lark, Mirafra africana
- Flappet lark, Mirafra rufocinnamomea
- Collared lark, Mirafra collaris
- Gillett's lark, Mirafra gilletti
- Pink-breasted lark, Calendulauda poecilosterna
- Fawn-coloured lark, Calendulauda africanoides
- Archer's lark, Heteromirafra archeri
- Sidamo lark, Heteromirafra sidamoensis
- Chestnut-backed sparrow-lark, Eremopterix leucotis
- Black-crowned sparrow-lark, Eremopterix nigriceps
- Chestnut-headed sparrow-lark, Eremopterix signata
- Desert lark, Ammomanes deserti
- Greater hoopoe-lark, Alaemon alaudipes
- Lesser hoopoe-lark, Alaemon hamertoni (E)
- Greater short-toed lark, Calandrella brachydactyla
- Rufous-capped lark, Calandrella eremica
- Red-capped lark, Calandrella cinerea
- Somali short-toed lark, Alaudala somalica
- Obbia lark, Spizocorys obbiensis (E)
- Short-tailed lark, Spizocorys fremantlii
- Crested lark, Galerida cristata
- Thekla lark, Galerida theklae

== Swallows and martins ==
Order: Passeriformes Family: Hirundinidae

The family Hirundinidae is adapted to aerial feeding. They have a slender streamlined body, long pointed wings and a short bill with a wide gape. The feet are adapted to perching rather than walking, and the front toes are partially joined at the base. There are 75 species worldwide and 12 species which occur in Somaliland.

- Sand martin, Riparia riparia
- Brown-throated martin, Riparia paludicola
- Banded martin, Riparia cincta
- Pale crag martin, Ptyonoprogne obsoleta
- Barn swallow, Hirundo rustica
- Red-chested swallow, Hirundo lucida
- Ethiopian swallow, Hirundo aethiopica
- Wire-tailed swallow, Hirundo smithii
- Lesser striped swallow, Cecropis abyssinica
- Mosque swallow, Cecropis senegalensis
- Red-rumped swallow, Cecropis daurica
- Common house martin, Delichon urbicum

== Wagtails and pipits ==
Order: Passeriformes Family: Motacillidae

Motacillidae is a family of small passerine birds with medium to long tails. They include the wagtails, longclaws and pipits. They are slender, ground feeding insectivores of open country. There are 54 species worldwide and 14 species which occur in Somaliland.

- White wagtail, Motacilla alba
- African pied wagtail, Motacilla aguimp
- Yellow wagtail, Motacilla flava
- Grey wagtail, Motacilla cinerea
- Golden pipit, Tmetothylacus tenellus
- Yellow-throated longclaw, Macronyx croceus
- Pangani longclaw, Macronyx aurantiigula
- Plain-backed pipit, Anthus leucophrys
- African pipit, Anthus cinnamomeus
- Malindi pipit, Anthus melindae
- Tawny pipit, Anthus campestris
- Long-billed pipit, Anthus similis
- Tree pipit, Anthus trivialis
- Red-throated pipit, Anthus cervinus

== Cuckooshrikes ==
Order: Passeriformes Family: Campephagidae

The cuckooshrikes are small to medium-sized passerine birds. They are predominantly greyish with white and black, although some species are brightly coloured. There are 82 species worldwide and 3 species which occur in Somaliland.

- Grey cuckooshrike, Coracina caesia
- Black cuckooshrike, Campephaga flava
- Red-shouldered cuckooshrike, Campephaga phoenicea

== Bulbuls ==
Order: Passeriformes Family: Pycnonotidae

Bulbuls are medium-sized songbirds. Some are colourful with yellow, red or orange vents, cheeks, throats or supercilia, but most are drab, with uniform olive-brown to black plumage. Some species have distinct crests. There are 130 species worldwide and 7 species which occur in Somaliland.

- Common bulbul, Pycnonotus barbatus
- Sombre greenbul, Andropadus importunus
- Yellow-bellied greenbul, Chlorocichla flaviventris
- Fischer's greenbul, Phyllastrephus fischeri
- Terrestrial brownbul, Phyllastrephus terrestris
- Northern brownbul, Phyllastrephus strepitans
- Eastern nicator, Nicator gularis

== Thrushes and allies ==
Order: Passeriformes Family: Turdidae

The thrushes are a group of passerine birds that occur mainly in the Old World. They are plump, soft plumaged, small to medium-sized insectivores or sometimes omnivores, often feeding on the ground. Many have attractive songs.

- Red-tailed ant thrush, Neocossyphus rufus
- African bare-eyed thrush, Turdus tephronotus

== Cisticolas and allies ==
Order: Passeriformes Family: Cisticolidae

The Cisticolidae are warblers found mainly in warmer southern regions of the Old World. They are generally very small birds of drab brown or grey appearance found in open country such as grassland or scrub.

- Boran cisticola, Cisticola bodessa
- Rattling cisticola, Cisticola chiniana
- Ashy cisticola, Cisticola cinereolus
- Coastal cisticola, Cisticola haematocephalus
- Croaking cisticola, Cisticola natalensis
- Siffling cisticola, Cisticola brachypterus
- Tiny cisticola, Cisticola nana
- Zitting cisticola, Cisticola juncidis
- Desert cisticola, Cisticola aridulus
- Pectoral-patch cisticola, Cisticola brunnescens
- Graceful prinia, Prinia gracilis
- Tawny-flanked prinia, Prinia subflava
- Pale prinia, Prinia somalica
- Red-fronted prinia, Prinia rufifrons
- Yellow-breasted apalis, Apalis flavida
- Black-headed apalis, Apalis melanocephala
- Green-backed camaroptera, Camaroptera brachyura
- Grey wren-warbler, Calamonastes simplex
- Yellow-vented eremomela, Eremomela flavicrissalis
- Yellow-bellied eremomela, Eremomela icteropygialis

== African warblers ==
Order: Passeriformes Family: Macrosphenidae

- Northern crombec, Sylvietta brachyura
- Short-billed crombec, Sylvietta philippae
- Red-faced crombec, Sylvietta whytii
- Somali crombec, Sylvietta isabellina

== Locustellid warblers ==
Order: Passeriformes Family: Locustellidae

- Eurasian river warbler, Locustella fluviatilis

== Acrocephalid warblers ==
Order: Passeriformes Family: Acrocephalidae

- Sedge warbler, Acrocephalus schoenobaenus
- Common reed warbler, Acrocephalus scirpaceus
- Marsh warbler, Acrocephalus palustris
- Great reed warbler, Acrocephalus arundinaceus
- Clamorous reed warbler, Acrocephalus stentoreus
- Basra reed warbler, Acrocephalus griseldis
- Lesser swamp warbler, Acrocephalus gracilirostris
- Booted warbler, Iduna caligata
- Eastern olivaceous warbler, Iduna pallida
- Upcher's warbler, Hippolais languida
- Olive-tree warbler, Hippolais olivetorum
- Icterine warbler, Hippolais icterina

== Phylloscopid warblers ==
Order: Passeriformes Family: Phylloscopidae

- Brown woodland warbler, Phylloscopus umbrovirens
- Willow warbler, Phylloscopus trochilus
- Common chiffchaff, Phylloscopus collybita
- Wood warbler, Phylloscopus sibilatrix

== Sylviid warblers, parrotbills, and allies ==
Order: Passeriformes Family: Sylviidae

The family Sylviidae is a group of small insectivorous passerine birds. They mainly occur as breeding species, as the common name implies, in Europe, Asia and, to a lesser extent, Africa. Most are of generally undistinguished appearance, but many have distinctive songs.

- Eurasian blackcap, Sylvia atricapilla
- Garden warbler, Sylvia borin
- Greater whitethroat, Sylvia communis
- Lesser whitethroat, Sylvia curruca
- African desert warbler, Sylvia deserti
- Barred warbler, Sylvia nisoria
- Western Orphean warbler, Sylvia hortensis
- Red Sea warbler, Sylvia leucomelaena
- Eastern subalpine warbler, Sylvia cantillans
- Menetries's warbler, Sylvia mystacea
- Banded parisoma, Sylvia boehmi

== Old World flycatchers ==
Order: Passeriformes Family: Muscicapidae

Old World flycatchers are a large group of small passerine birds native to the Old World. They are mainly small arboreal insectivores. The appearance of these birds is highly varied, but they mostly have weak songs and harsh calls.

- Rufous-tailed rock thrush, Monticola saxatilis
- Little rock thrush, Monticola rufocinereus
- Blue rock thrush, Monticola solitarius
- Pale flycatcher, Melaenornis pallidus
- African grey flycatcher, Melaenornis microrhynchus
- Northern black flycatcher, Melaenornis edolioides
- Southern black flycatcher, Melaenornis pammelaina
- Spotted flycatcher, Muscicapa striata
- Gambaga flycatcher, Muscicapa gambagae
- Ashy flycatcher, Muscicapa caerulescens
- Semicollared flycatcher, Ficedula semitorquata
- Thrush nightingale, Luscinia luscinia
- Common nightingale, Luscinia megarhynchos
- Bluethroat, Luscinia svecica
- White-throated robin, Irania gutturalis
- White-browed robin-chat, Cossypha heuglini
- Red-capped robin-chat, Cossypha natalensis
- Spotted morning-thrush, Cichladusa guttata
- Bearded scrub robin, Cercotrichas quadrivirgata
- Red-backed scrub-robin, Cercotrichas leucophrys
- Rufous-tailed scrub robin, Cercotrichas galactotes
- Black scrub robin, Cercotrichas podobe
- Black redstart, Phoenicurus ochruros
- Common redstart, Phoenicurus phoenicurus
- Whinchat, Saxicola rubetra
- African stonechat, Saxicola torquatus
- White-tailed wheatear, Oenanthe leucopyga
- Hooded wheatear, Oenanthe monacha
- Somali wheatear, Oenanthe phillipsi
- Northern wheatear, Oenanthe oenanthe
- Mourning wheatear, Oenanthe lugens
- Pied wheatear, Oenanthe pleschanka
- Black-eared wheatear, Oenanthe hispanica
- Kurdish wheatear, Oenanthe xanthoprymna
- Desert wheatear, Oenanthe deserti
- Capped wheatear, Oenanthe pileata
- Isabelline wheatear, Oenanthe isabellina
- Heuglin's wheatear, Oenanthe heuglini
- Brown-tailed chat, Cercomela scotocerca
- Sombre chat, Cercomela dubia
- Blackstart, Cercomela melanura
- White-winged cliff-chat, Thamnolaea semirufa

== Wattle-eyes ==
Order: Passeriformes Family: Platysteiridae

The wattle-eyes, or puffback flycatchers, are small stout passerine birds of the African tropics. They get their name from the brightly coloured fleshy eye decorations found in most species in this group.

- Black-and-white shrike-flycatcher, Bias musicus
- Black-throated wattle-eye, Platysteira peltata
- Grey-headed batis, Batis orientalis
- Eastern black-headed batis, Batis minor
- Pygmy batis, Batis perkeo

== Erythrocercid flycatchers ==
Order: Passeriformes Family: Erythrocercidae

- Yellow flycatcher, Erythrocercus holochlorus

== Monarch flycatchers ==
Order: Passeriformes Family: Monarchidae

The monarch flycatchers are small to medium-sized insectivorous passerines which hunt by flycatching.

- Yellow flycatcher, Erythrocercus holochlorus
- African crested-flycatcher, Trochocercus cyanomelas
- African paradise-flycatcher, Terpsiphone viridis

== Laughingthrushes ==
Order: Passeriformes Family: Leiothrichidae

- Scaly chatterer, Turdoides aylmeri
- Rufous chatterer, Turdoides rubiginosus
- Scaly babbler, Turdoides squamulatus
- White-rumped babbler, Turdoides leucopygius

== Chickadees and titmice ==
Order: Passeriformes Family: Paridae

The Paridae are mainly small stocky woodland species with short stout bills. Some have crests. They are adaptable birds, with a mixed diet including seeds and insects. There are 59 species worldwide and 1 species which occurs in Somaliland.

- Somali tit, Melaniparus thruppi

== Penduline tits ==
Order: Passeriformes Family: Remizidae

The penduline tits are a group of small passerine birds related to the true tits. They are insectivores. There are 13 species worldwide and 1 species which occurs in Somaliland.

- Mouse-coloured penduline-tit, Anthoscopus musculus

== Sunbirds and spiderhunters ==
Order: Passeriformes Family: Nectariniidae

The sunbirds and spiderhunters are very small passerine birds which feed largely on nectar, although they will also take insects, especially when feeding young. Flight is fast and direct on their short wings. Most species can take nectar by hovering like a hummingbird, but usually perch to feed.

- Eastern violet-backed sunbird, Anthreptes orientalis
- Collared sunbird, Hedydipna collaris
- Pygmy sunbird, Hedydipna platura
- Nile Valley sunbird, Hedydipna metallica
- Eastern olive-sunbird, Cyanomitra olivacea
- Mouse-coloured sunbird, Cyanomitra veroxii
- Amethyst sunbird, Chalcomitra amethystina
- Scarlet-chested sunbird, Chalcomitra senegalensis
- Hunter's sunbird, Chalcomitra hunteri
- Beautiful sunbird, Cinnyris pulchellus
- Mariqua sunbird, Cinnyris mariquensis
- Black-bellied sunbird, Cinnyris nectarinioides
- Purple-banded sunbird, Cinnyris bifasciatus
- Tsavo sunbird, Cinnyris tsavoensis
- Violet-breasted sunbird, Cinnyris chalcomelas
- Shining sunbird, Cinnyris habessinicus
- Variable sunbird, Cinnyris venustus

== White-eyes ==
Order: Passeriformes Family: Zosteropidae

The white-eyes are small and mostly undistinguished, their plumage above being generally some dull colour like greenish-olive, but some species have a white or bright yellow throat, breast or lower parts, and several have buff flanks. As their name suggests, many species have a white ring around each eye.

- Abyssinian white-eye, Zosterops abyssinicus
- Pale white-eye, Zosterops flavilateralis

== Old World orioles ==
Order: Passeriformes Family: Oriolidae

The Old World orioles are colourful passerine birds. They are not related to the New World orioles. There are 29 species worldwide and 3 species which occur in Somaliland.

- Eurasian golden oriole, Oriolus oriolus
- African golden oriole, Oriolus auratus
- African black-headed oriole, Oriolus larvatus

== Shrikes ==
Order: Passeriformes Family: Laniidae

Shrikes are passerine birds known for their habit of catching other birds and small animals and impaling the uneaten portions of their bodies on thorns. A typical shrike's beak is hooked, like a bird of prey.

- Red-backed shrike, Lanius collurio
- Isabelline shrike, Lanius isabellinus
- Red-tailed shrike, Lanius phoenicuroides
- Great grey shrike, Lanius excubitor
- Lesser grey shrike, Lanius minor
- Long-tailed fiscal, Lanius cabanisi
- Taita fiscal, Lanius dorsalis
- Somali fiscal, Lanius somalicus
- Masked shrike, Lanius nubicus
- Woodchat shrike, Lanius senator
- White-rumped shrike, Eurocephalus ruppelli

== Bushshrikes and allies ==
Order: Passeriformes Family: Malaconotidae

Bushshrikes are similar in habits to shrikes, hunting insects and other small prey from a perch on a bush. Although similar in build to the shrikes, these tend to be either colourful species or largely black; some species are quite secretive.

- Brubru, Nilaus afer
- Northern puffback, Dryoscopus gambensis
- Pringle's puffback, Dryoscopus pringlii
- Black-backed puffback, Dryoscopus cubla
- Black-crowned tchagra, Tchagra senegala
- Three-streaked tchagra, Tchagra jamesi
- Red-naped bushshrike, Laniarius ruficeps
- Ethiopian boubou, Laniarius aethiopicus
- Black boubou, Laniarius nigerrimus
- East Coast boubou, Laniarius sublacteus
- Slate-colored boubou, Laniarius funebris
- Rosy-patched bushshrike, Rhodophoneus cruentus
- Sulphur-breasted bushshrike, Telophorus sulfureopectus
- Four-colored bushshrike, Telophorus viridis
- Grey-headed bushshrike, Malaconotus blanchoti

== Vangas, helmetshrikes, and allies ==
Order: Passeriformes Family: Vangidae

The helmetshrikes are similar in build to the shrikes, but tend to be colourful species with distinctive crests or other head ornaments, such as wattles, from which they get their name.

- White helmetshrike, Prionops plumatus
- Retz's helmetshrike, Prionops retzii
- Chestnut-fronted helmetshrike, Prionops scopifrons

== Drongos ==
Order: Passeriformes Family: Dicruridae

The drongos are mostly black or dark grey in colour, sometimes with metallic tints. They have long forked tails, and some Asian species have elaborate tail decorations. They have short legs and sit very upright when perched, like a shrike. They flycatch or take prey from the ground. There are 2 species which occur in Somaliland.

- Common square-tailed drongo, Dicrurus ludwigii
- Fork-tailed drongo, Dicrurus adsimilis

== Crows, jays, ravens and magpies ==
Order: Passeriformes Family: Corvidae

The family Corvidae includes crows, ravens, jays, choughs, magpies, treepies, nutcrackers and ground jays. Corvids are above average in size among the Passeriformes, and some of the larger species show high levels of intelligence. There are 120 species worldwide and 7 species which occur in Somaliland.

- House crow, Corvus splendens
- Cape crow, Corvus capensis
- Pied crow, Corvus albus
- Brown-necked raven, Corvus ruficollis
- Somali crow, Corvus edithae
- Fan-tailed raven, Corvus rhipidurus
- Thick-billed raven, Corvus crassirostris

== Starlings ==
Order: Passeriformes Family: Sturnidae

Starlings are small to medium-sized passerine birds. Their flight is strong and direct and they are very gregarious. Their preferred habitat is fairly open country. They eat insects and fruit. Plumage is typically dark with a metallic sheen.

- European starling, Sturnus vulgaris
- Wattled starling, Creatophora cinerea
- Greater blue-eared glossy-starling, Lamprotornis chalybaeus
- Lesser blue-eared glossy-starling, Lamprotornis chloropterus
- Rueppell's glossy-starling, Lamprotornis purpuropterus
- Golden-breasted starling, Lamprotornis regius
- Superb starling, Lamprotornis superbus
- Shelley's starling, Lamprotornis shelleyi
- Black-bellied starling, Notopholia corrusca
- Violet-backed starling, Cinnyricinclus leucogaster
- Fischer's starling, Lamprotornis fischeri
- White-crowned starling, Lamprotornis albicapillus
- Red-winged starling, Onychognathus morio
- Somali starling, Onychognathus blythii
- Bristle-crowned starling, Onychognathus salvadorii
- Magpie starling, Speculipastor bicolor
- Red-billed oxpecker, Buphagus erythrorhynchus

== Weavers and allies ==
Order: Passeriformes Family: Ploceidae

The weavers are small passerine birds related to the finches. They are seed-eating birds with rounded conical bills. The males of many species are brightly coloured, usually in red or yellow and black, some species show variation in colour only in the breeding season. There are 116 species worldwide and 27 species which occur in Somaliland.

- Red-billed buffalo-weaver, Bubalornis niger
- White-headed buffalo-weaver, Dinemellia dinemelli
- Speckle-fronted weaver, Sporopipes frontalis
- White-browed sparrow-weaver, Plocepasser mahali
- Donaldson-Smith's sparrow-weaver, Plocepasser donaldsoni
- Grey-headed social-weaver, Pseudonigrita arnaudi
- Black-capped social-weaver, Pseudonigrita cabanisi
- Lesser masked-weaver, Ploceus intermedius
- Black-necked weaver, Ploceus nigricollis
- African golden-weaver, Ploceus subaureus
- Golden palm weaver, Ploceus bojeri
- Rueppell's weaver, Ploceus galbula
- Northern masked-weaver, Ploceus taeniopterus
- Vitelline masked-weaver, Ploceus vitellinus
- Village weaver, Ploceus cucullatus
- Speke's weaver, Ploceus spekei
- Salvadori's weaver, Ploceus dichrocephalus
- Chestnut weaver, Ploceus rubiginosus
- Forest weaver, Ploceus bicolor
- Red-headed weaver, Anaplectes rubriceps
- Red-headed quelea, Quelea erythrops
- Red-billed quelea, Quelea quelea
- Fire-fronted bishop, Euplectes diadematus
- Black-winged bishop, Euplectes hordeaceus
- Orange bishop, Euplectes franciscanus
- Fan-tailed widowbird, Euplectes axillaris
- Grosbeak weaver, Amblyospiza albifrons

== Waxbills and allies ==
Order: Passeriformes Family: Estrildidae

The estrildid finches are small passerine birds of the Old World tropics and Australasia. They are gregarious and often colonial seed eaters with short thick but pointed bills. They are all similar in structure and habits, but have wide variation in plumage colours and patterns.

- Green-winged pytilia, Pytilia melba
- Peters's twinspot, Hypargos niveoguttatus
- Red-billed firefinch, Lagonosticta senegala
- Black-faced firefinch, Lagonosticta larvata
- Red-cheeked cordonbleu, Uraeginthus bengalus
- Blue-capped cordonbleu, Uraeginthus cyanocephalus
- Purple grenadier, Uraeginthus ianthinogaster
- Crimson-rumped waxbill, Estrilda rhodopyga
- Common waxbill, Estrilda astrild
- Red-rumped waxbill, Estrilda charmosyna
- African silverbill, Euodice cantans
- Grey-headed silverbill, Odontospiza caniceps
- Bronze mannikin, Spermestes cucullatus
- Black-and-white mannikin, Spermestes bicolor
- Cut-throat, Amadina fasciata

== Indigobirds ==
Order: Passeriformes Family: Viduidae

The indigobirds are finch-like species which usually have black or indigo predominating in their plumage. All are brood parasites, which lay their eggs in the nests of estrildid finches. There are 20 species worldwide and 5 species which occur in Somaliland.

- Village indigobird, Vidua chalybeata
- Steel-blue whydah, Vidua hypocherina
- Straw-tailed whydah, Vidua fischeri
- Pin-tailed whydah, Vidua macroura
- Eastern paradise-whydah, Vidua paradisaea

== Old World buntings ==
Order: Passeriformes Family: Emberizidae

The emberizids are a large family of passerine birds. They are seed-eating birds with distinctively shaped bills. Many emberizid species have distinctive head patterns.

- Ortolan bunting, Emberiza hortulana
- Striolated bunting, Emberiza striolata
- Cinnamon-breasted bunting, Emberiza tahapisi
- Somali bunting, Emberiza poliopleura

== Finches, euphonias, and allies ==
Order: Passeriformes Family: Fringillidae

Finches are seed-eating passerine birds, that are small to moderately large and have a strong beak, usually conical and in some species very large. All have twelve tail feathers and nine primaries. These birds have a bouncing flight with alternating bouts of flapping and gliding on closed wings, and most sing well.

- Somali golden-winged grosbeak, Rhynchostruthus louisae (E)
- Warsangli linnet, Linaria johannis (E)
- Black-throated canary, Crithagra atrogularis
- Reichenow's seedeater, Crithagra reichenowi
- Yellow-fronted canary, Crithagra mozambicus
- Northern grosbeak-canary, Crithagra donaldsoni
- White-bellied canary, Crithagra dorsostriatus
- Brown-rumped seedeater, Crithagra tristriatus

== Old World sparrows ==
Order: Passeriformes Family: Passeridae

Old World sparrows are small passerine birds. In general, sparrows tend to be small, plump, brown or grey birds with short tails and short powerful beaks. Sparrows are seed eaters, but they also consume small insects.

- House sparrow, Passer domesticus (I)
- Somali sparrow, Passer castanopterus
- Grey-headed sparrow, Passer griseus
- Swainson's sparrow, Passer swainsonii
- Parrot-billed sparrow, Passer gongonensis
- Arabian golden-sparrow, Passer euchlorus
- Chestnut sparrow, Passer eminibey
- Yellow-spotted petronia, Gymnoris pyrgita

== See also ==
- List of birds
- Lists of birds by region
- Wildlife of Somaliland
