= Conomitra =

Conomitra is the scientific name of two genera of organisms and may refer to:

- Conomitra (gastropod), a genus of snails in the family Volutomitridae
- Conomitra (plant), a genus of plants in the family Apocynaceae
