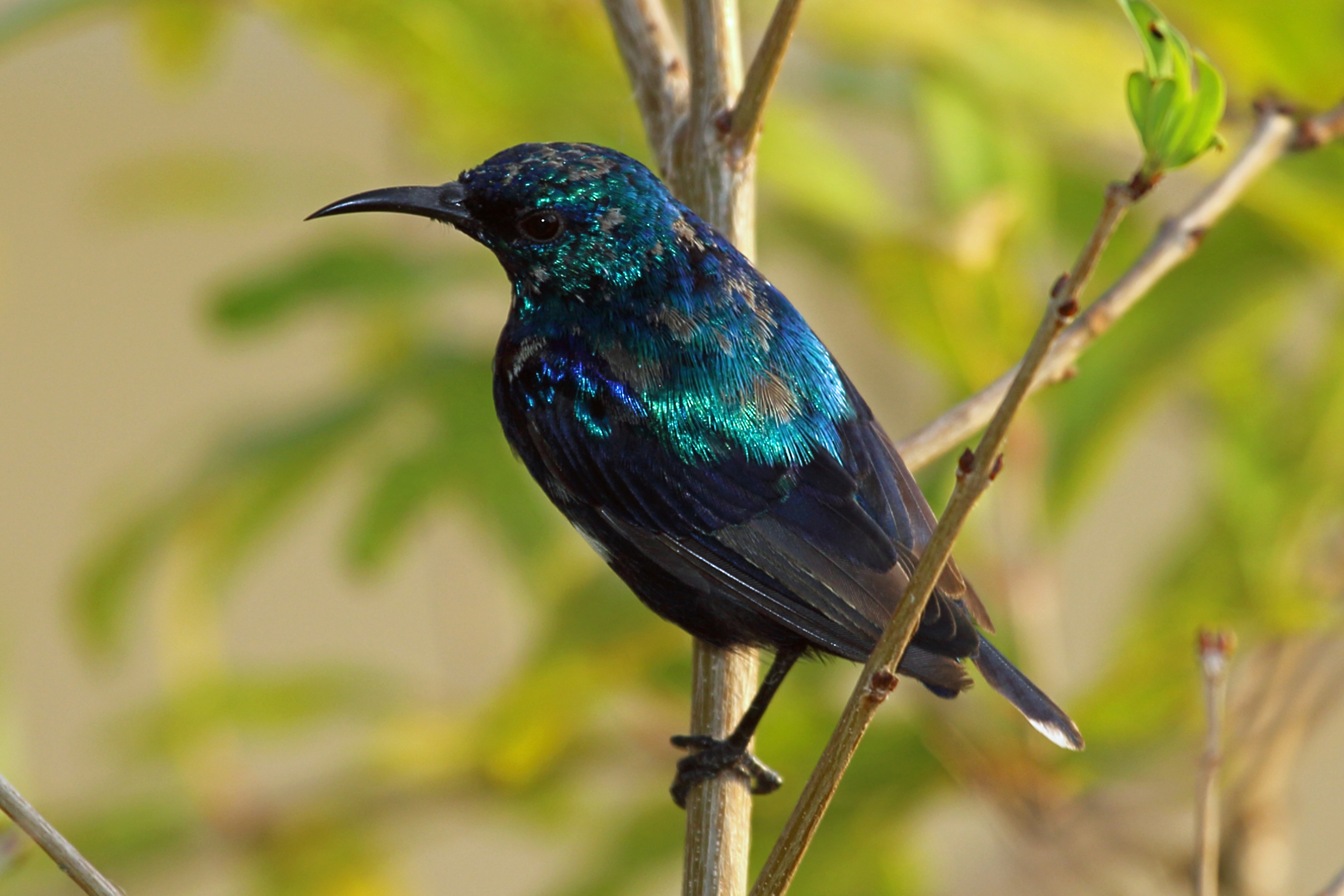

Conservation status
- Least Concern (IUCN 3.1)

Scientific classification
- Kingdom: Animalia
- Phylum: Chordata
- Class: Aves
- Order: Passeriformes
- Family: Nectariniidae
- Genus: Cinnyris
- Species: C. pembae

Binomial name
- Cinnyris pembae Reichenow, 1905
- Range in Tanzania

Synonyms
- Nectarinia pembae

= Pemba sunbird =

Species of bird

The Pemba sunbird (Cinnyris pembae) is a species of bird in the sunbird family. It is endemic to Pemba Island, Tanzania.

== Taxonomy ==
Anton Reichenow first described the Pemba sunbird in 1905.

The taxonomy of the Pemba sunbird has been the subject of debate. Pakenham regarded it as a subspecies of the purple-banded sunbird under the name Cinnyris bifasciatus pembae. It is also sometimes regarded as conspecific with the violet-breasted sunbird, Cinnyris chalcomelas, which lives on the mainland in Kenya. Cinnyris pembae is distinguished from these closely related species by being the only purple-banded sunbird on Pemba Island. It is also significantly smaller than its fellow sunbirds. Hermann Grote regarded the Pemba sunbird to be identical in coloration, but about half the size, of Cinnyris voeltzkowi (today recognized as a subspecies of the Malagasy green sunbird, Cinnyris notatus).

== Description ==
Males have a wingspan of 51.5-53 mm, while females have a wingspan of 47.5-50 mm. Adult males display iridescent blue-green coloration on their head and throat with bluish violet coloration on their wings and across their breast. Females have a gray-brown coloration on their head and wings, a pale yellow underside with blurry streaking and a small pale yellow lateral streak posterior to the eye. Juveniles resemble adult females with darker chin and throat, broad whitish malar stripe, and mottled grey underparts.

== Behavior ==
Pemba sunbirds consume nectar and fruits. They have been observed nesting in Wellingtonia trees and consuming the trees' nectar. Other favored foods include the white berries of Flueggea virosa, into which the Pemba sunbird jabs its beak, while smaller berries are eaten whole.

Breeding takes place throughout the year with a noted lull between the months of January and April, inclusive. Males exhibit aggression to each other during breeding season. Nesting takes place approximately from July through December. Greenish-white eggs with brown streaks are laid in a "bag or purse-shaped nest suspended 1-2 m up from shrub or amongst foliage."

The Pemba sunbird is known for a repetitive tslink-tslink-tslink call which is unlike that of its relatives on the mainland. It can be found in a wide variety of habitats on Pemba Island.

== Bibliography ==
Articles

- Archer, A. L.; Turner, D. A. (1993). "Notes on the endemic species and some additional new birds occurring on Pemba Island, Tanzania". Scopus. 16: 94–98.
- Clancey, PA; Williams, John (1967). "The systematics of the Little Purple-banded Sunbird Cinnyris bifasciatus (Shaw), with notes on its allies". Durban Museum Novitates. 5: 27–41. hdl:10520/AJA0012723X_1304.
- Grote, Hermann (1930). "Über de Formenkreis des Laniarius barbarus". Falco (in German). 26: 8–13.
- Pakenham, R. H. W. (1936). "Field-notes on the Birds of Zanzibar and Pemba". Ibis. 78 (2): 249–272. doi:10.1111/j.1474-919X.1936.tb03372.x. ISSN 0019-1019.
- Pakenham, R. H. W. (1943). "Field-notes on the Birds of Zanzibar and Pemba". Ibis. 85 (2): 165–189. doi:10.1111/j.1474-919X.1943.tb03826.x. ISSN 0019-1019.
- Reichenow, Anton (1918). "Vogelarten des afrikanischen Faunengebiets, die von 1905–1914 neu beschrieben worden sind". Journal für Ornithologie (in German). 66: 61–110. doi:10.1007/BF02251725.

Books

- Cheke, Robert A.; Mann, Clive F.; Allen, Richard (2001). Sunbirds: A Guide to the Sunbirds, Flowerpeckers, Spiderhunters and Sugarbirds of the World. London: Christopher Helm Publishers. ISBN 978-1-8734-0380-8.
- Stevenson, Terry; Fanshawe, John (2002). Birds of East Africa: Kenya, Tanzania, Uganda, Rwanda, Burundi. London: T. & A. D. Poyser. ISBN 0-85661-079-8. LCCN 00-110863.

Webpages

- "Pemba Sunbird - eBird". eBird.
- BirdLife International (2024). "Cinnyris pembae". IUCN Red List of Threatened Species. 2024 e.T22718017A263921639. doi:10.2305/IUCN.UK.2024-2.RLTS.T22718017A263921639.en.
