= Odontanthera =

Scientific classification
- Kingdom: Plantae
- Clade: Tracheophytes
- Clade: Angiosperms
- Clade: Eudicots
- Clade: Asterids
- Order: Gentianales
- Family: Apocynaceae
- Subfamily: Asclepiadoideae
- Tribe: Asclepiadeae
- Genus: Odontanthera; Wight
- Species: O. radians

Binomial name
- Odontanthera radians (Forssk.) D.V.Field

Synonyms
- Steinheilia Decne.; Asclepias radians Forssk.; Steinheilia radians (Forssk.) Decne.; Odontanthera reniformis Wight

Genus of flowering plants

Odontanthera is a genus of plants in the family Apocynaceae first described as a genus in 1883. It contains only one recognized species, Odontanthera radians, a rare plant native to the shores of the Red Sea.

formerly included

moved to other genera (Conomitra, Glossonema)

1. O. boveana now Glossonema boveanum
2. O. linearis now Conomitra linearis
3. O. thruppii now Glossonema thruppii
4. O. varians now Glossonema varians
