= List of ecoregions in Somaliland =

The following is a list of ecoregions in Somaliland as identified by the World Wide Fund for Nature (WWF).

== Terrestrial ==
Somaliland is in the Afrotropical realm. Its two ecoregions are in the deserts and xeric shrublands biome.

- Ethiopian xeric grasslands and shrublands
- Somali montane xeric woodlands
- Somali Acacia–Commiphora bushlands and thickets
