= National symbols of Somaliland =

Various national symbols of Somaliland include:

- National emblem of Somaliland
- Flag of Somaliland
- National anthem of Somaliland
