= Energy in Somaliland =

Energy in Somaliland refers to the production, storage, import, export, and consumption of energy in Somaliland, and is regulated by the Ministry of Energy and Minerals.

Local biomass resources and imported petroleum are the two main principal sources of energy sector in Somaliland, the electricity prices across the country is considered one of the highest in the world, while the consumption is among the lowest in Sub-Saharan Africa, as operated mostly by the private sector. As of 2020, over 20 IPPs were operating in Somaliland.

Between 2015 and 2021 Mott MacDonald completed installation of 1.9 MW of solar energy and connected it to the Somaliland grid. The effort was part of the £20 million Energy Security and Resource Efficiency in Somaliland (ESRES) program and was funded by the Government of the United Kingdom.

In 2028 Somaliland would open it first Refinery in Berbera Region with 30,000 bpd capacity and 300,000 Gallons of diesel per day output , Diesel for energy use would increase dramatically. with high Diesel Somaliland can increase diesel generator imports.

== Oil explorations ==
Genel is in advanced oil exploration with OCTG planned for Toosan drilling including installation of well taps. The Somaliland government awarded Genel Energy license to explore oil within its territory. Results of a surface seep study completed early in 2015 confirmed the outstanding potential offered in SL-10B and SL-13 block and Oodweyne block with estimated oil reserves of 1 billion barrels each.

== See also ==
- Economy of Somaliland
- Ministry of Energy and Minerals
- Politics of Somaliland
