= Violet-breasted sunbird =

Conservation status
- Least Concern (IUCN 3.1)

Scientific classification
- Kingdom: Animalia
- Phylum: Chordata
- Class: Aves
- Order: Passeriformes
- Family: Nectariniidae
- Genus: Cinnyris
- Species: C. chalcomelas

Binomial name
- Cinnyris chalcomelas Reichenow, 1905

Synonyms
- Nectarinia chalcomelas

Species of bird

The violet-breasted sunbird (Cinnyris chalcomelas) is a species of bird in the family Nectariniidae (sunbirds). It is found in Kenya and Somalia.

It is sometimes regarded as the same species as the Pemba sunbird.
