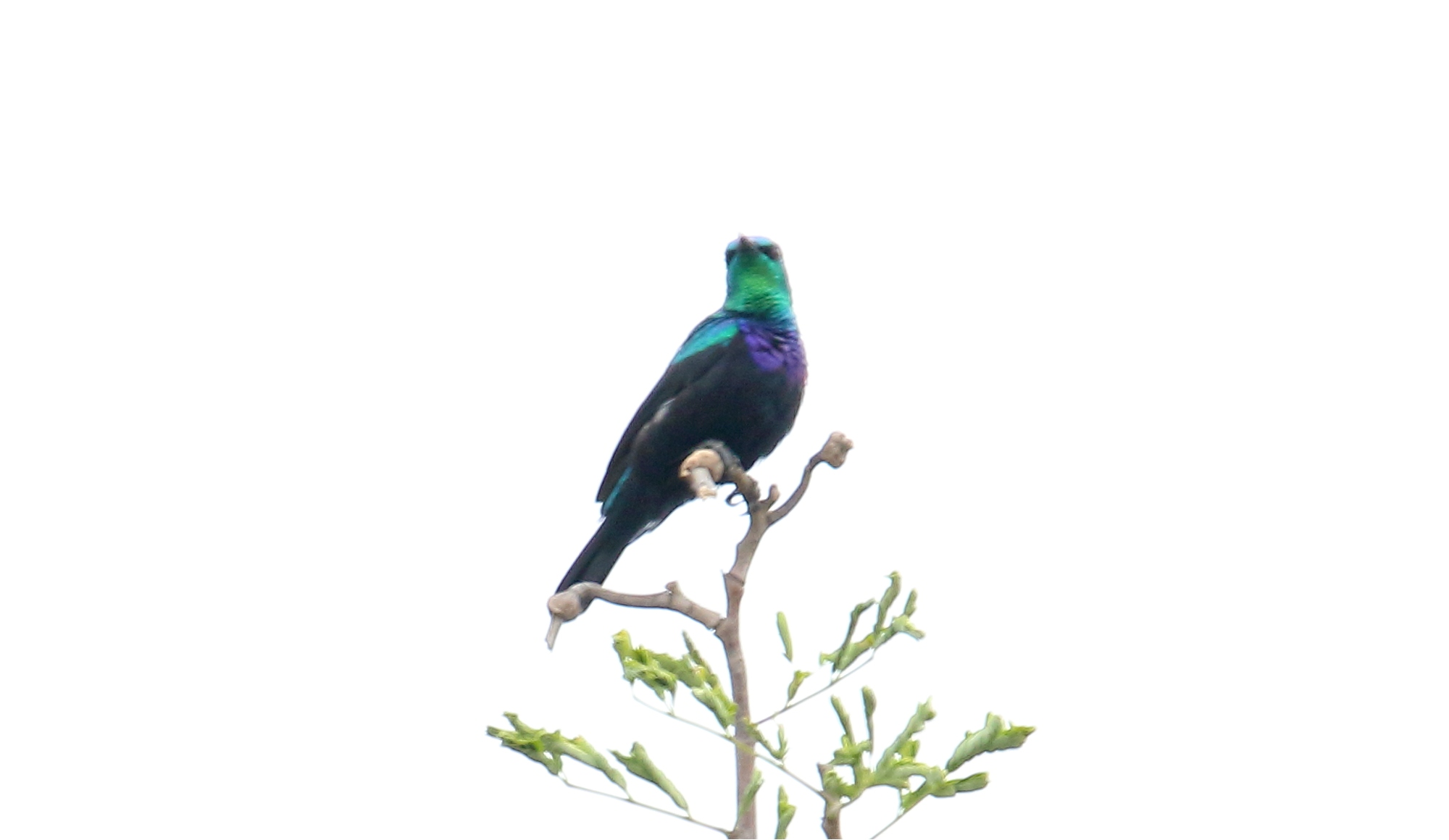

Conservation status
- Least Concern (IUCN 3.1)

Scientific classification
- Kingdom: Animalia
- Phylum: Chordata
- Class: Aves
- Order: Passeriformes
- Family: Nectariniidae
- Genus: Cinnyris
- Species: C. tsavoensis

Binomial name
- Cinnyris tsavoensis Van Someren, 1922

Synonyms
- Nectarinia tsavoensis

= Tsavo sunbird =

Species of bird

The Tsavo sunbird (Cinnyris tsavoensis) is a small passerine bird of Kenya and Tanzania. It is sometimes lumped with the purple-banded sunbird.

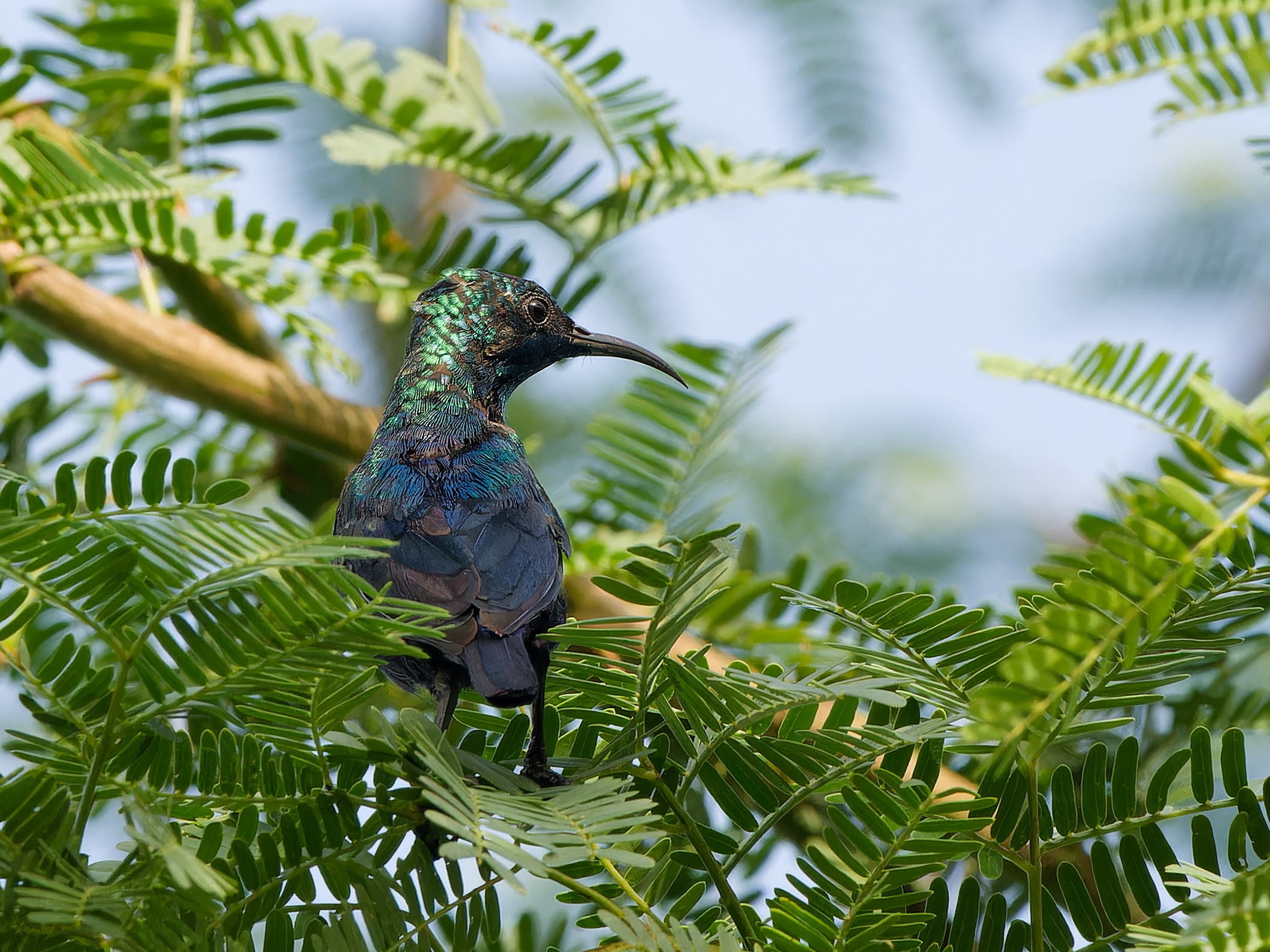
Tsavo Sunbird

== Range and habitat ==
It is found in the Tsavo region of southeastern Kenya and nearby northern Tanzania, but not on the coast. It lives in arid scrub with Commiphora and Acacia trees and shrubs.

== Description ==
The Tsavo sunbird is 9.5 to 10 cm (3.75 to 4 inches) long. The bill is down-curved and rather short for a sunbird, especially compared to that of the otherwise similar Marico sunbird.

The female is greyish-brown above and on the head with a white eyebrow stripe; the throat is either white or dusky with white edges (malar strips). The underparts are faintly yellow-tinged white with dusky stripes on the breast. The tail is bluish-black with grey edges and tip.

The juvenile male looks like the dark-throated form of the female. Later it develops a black throat and black wing coverts, both with green feathers intermixed, and often a wide black stripe down the belly.

The adult male is apparently the same at all seasons: gleaming bluish-green above and on the head, with a black belly and lower breast. The upper breast may have a maroon band, missing the center or complete and 3 to 5 mm wide. (The male purple-banded sunbird has a wider maroon band and a distinct non-breeding plumage.)

The song is "a rapid sputtering tsustiseesee, chuchiti-tsi-tsi-tsi-tsi sitisee-see-see-see chitisee…" and variants, sometimes only the last few notes. Calls resemble the purple-banded sunbird's: "[l]oud annoyance chatter, chi-chi-chi-chi…" and "a high tsik-tsiki-tsik or brrrzi."

== Classification ==
Some authorities consider it a subspecies of the purple-banded sunbird. Here it is considered a separate species following the Handbook of the Birds of the World and other authorities.
