= Wildlife of Somaliland =

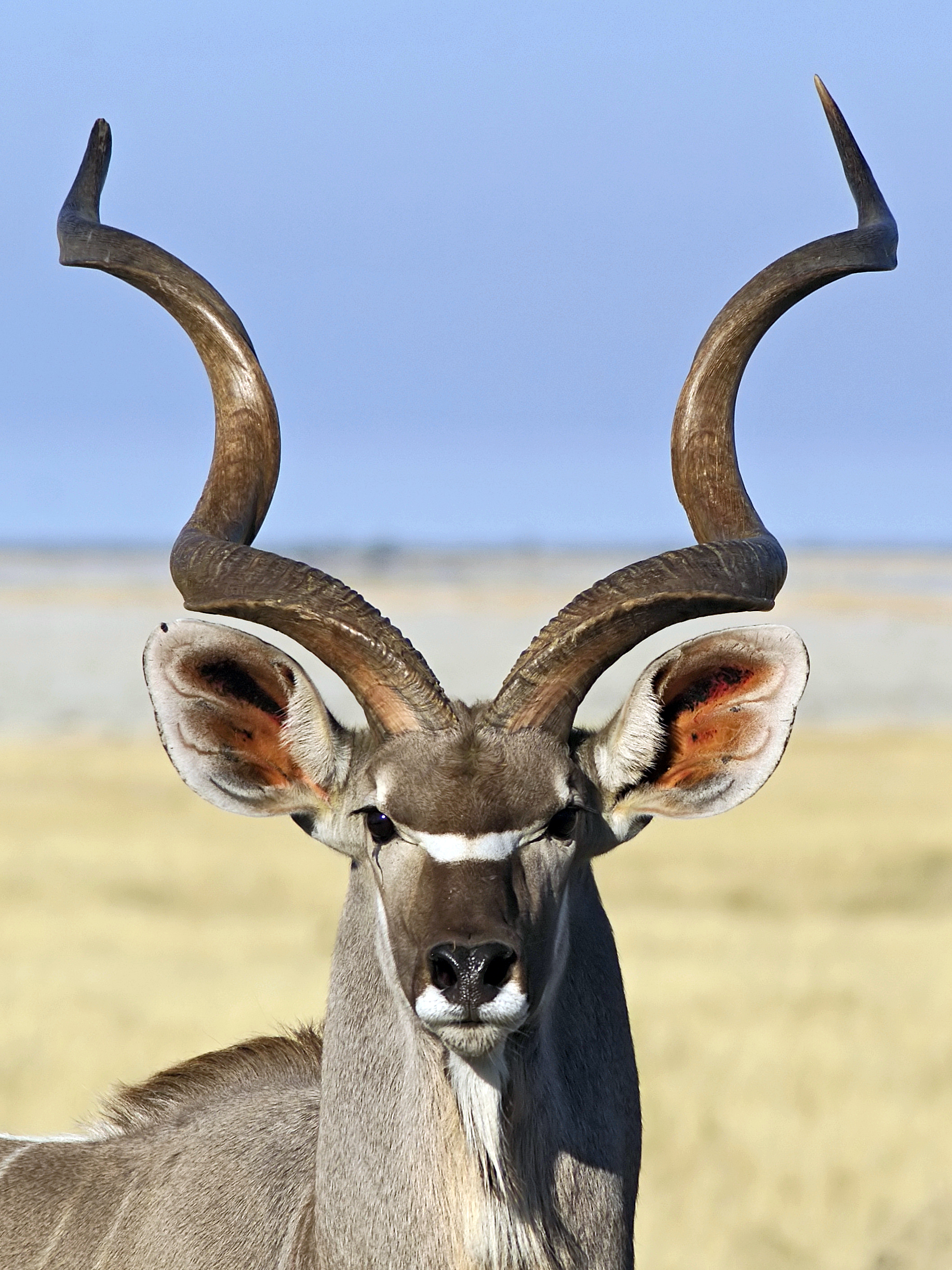
Kudu, the symbolic animal of Somaliland; considered the national animal of Somaliland

The wildlife of Somaliland includes the flora and fauna of Somaliland, which is extremely diverse due to the country's location between the temperate and the tropical zones. Somaliland is bordered by the Red Sea. The coastal region is more humid due to its proximity to the ocean. Somaliland is home to over 727 bird species and boasts over 177 species of mammals.

Somaliland is home to a diverse variety of flora and fauna, from acacia trees, to birds, large cats, and reptiles large and small.

In some areas, the mountains are covered with shrubs such as pyracantha, jasmine, poinsettia, and a varied assortment of evergreens. Caraway, carcade, cardamom, coriander, incense, myrrh, and red pepper are common.

== Lexicology ==
There are many forms of terminology and ways of describing the subphylums, metonyms and classifications of the various animals living within Somaliland. These include bahal ('creature'), doobjoog ('domestic animal/pet'), duurjoog/dugaag ('wild/undomesticated animal'), hangaguri ('general animal'), dalanga or its determiner form dalangihi ('chordate'), naasley ('mammal'), xasharaad ('insect'), beribiyood ('amphibian'), xamaarato ('reptile'), and noole ('organism').

== Fauna ==
=== Mammals ===
Somaliland contains a variety of mammals due to its geographical and climatic diversity. Wild animals are found in every region. Among the latter are the lion, Sudan cheetah, reticulated giraffe, hamadryas baboon, civet, serval, African bush elephant, bushpig, Soemmerring's gazelle, antelope, ibex, kudu, dik-dik, oribi, reedbuck, Somali wild ass, Grévy's zebra and hyena.

Since elephants are migratory, they are found in a variety of habitats, such as woodland, savanna, and tropical forest. Somaliland is home to a diverse variety of flora and fauna, from acacia trees, to birds, primates, large cats, and reptiles large and small. The yellow-spotted rock hyrax, which is found in savanna and rocky areas, looks much like a large rodent, but is actually related to elephants.

The following mammals are found exclusively in Somaliland:

- Pygmy gerbil
- Elephant shrew
- Berbera gerbil
- Greenwood's shrew
- Brockman's gerbil

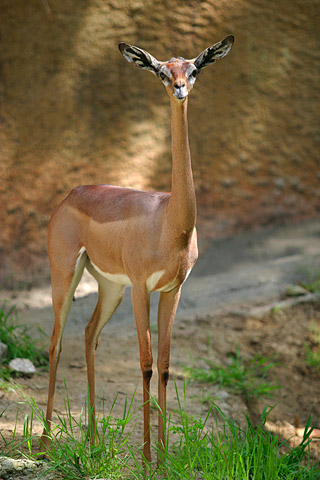
Gerenuk are found in Somaliland

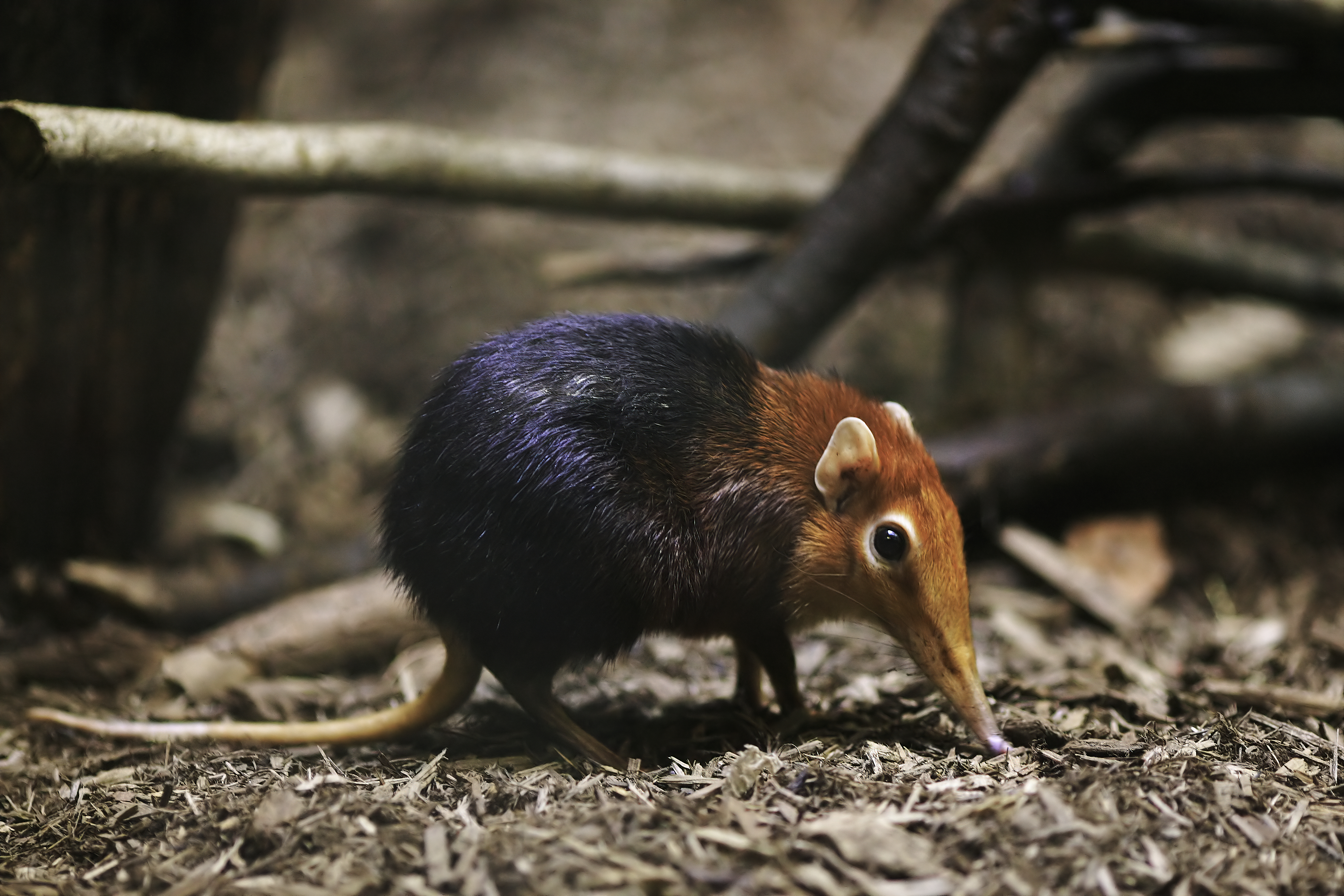
Elephant shrews are found in Somaliland

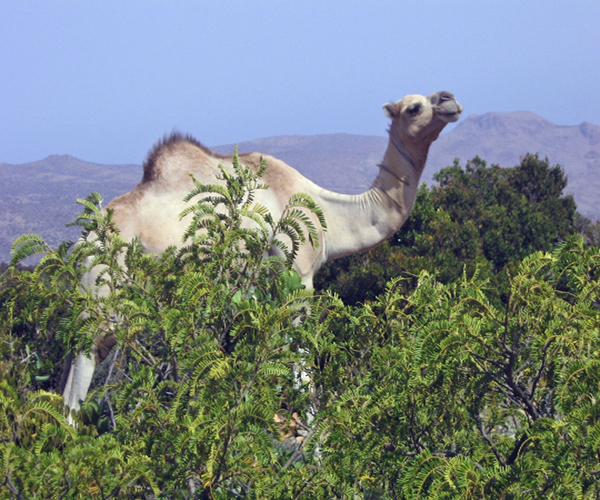
Somaliland has the world's largest population of camels

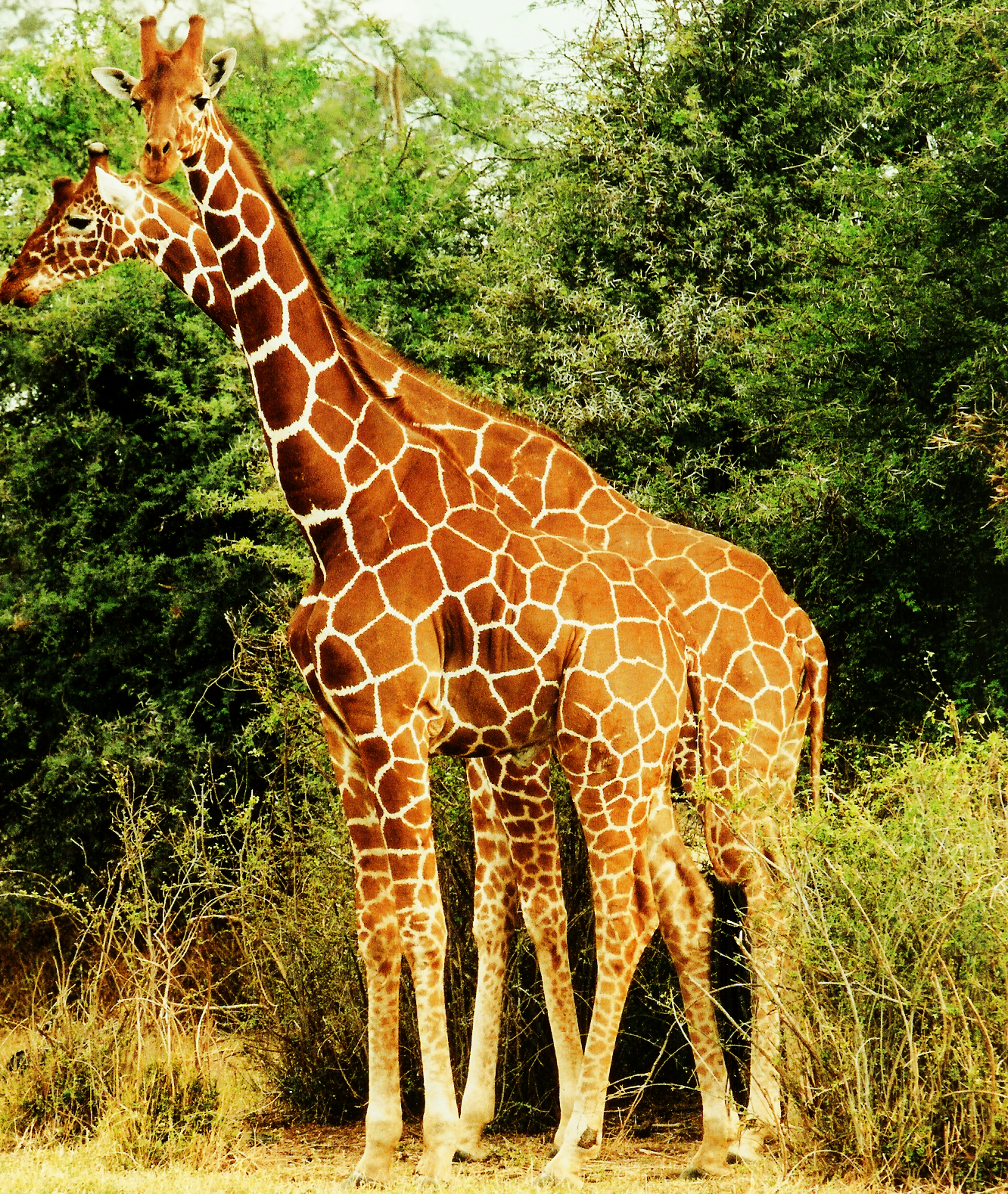
Giraffe

=== Birds ===
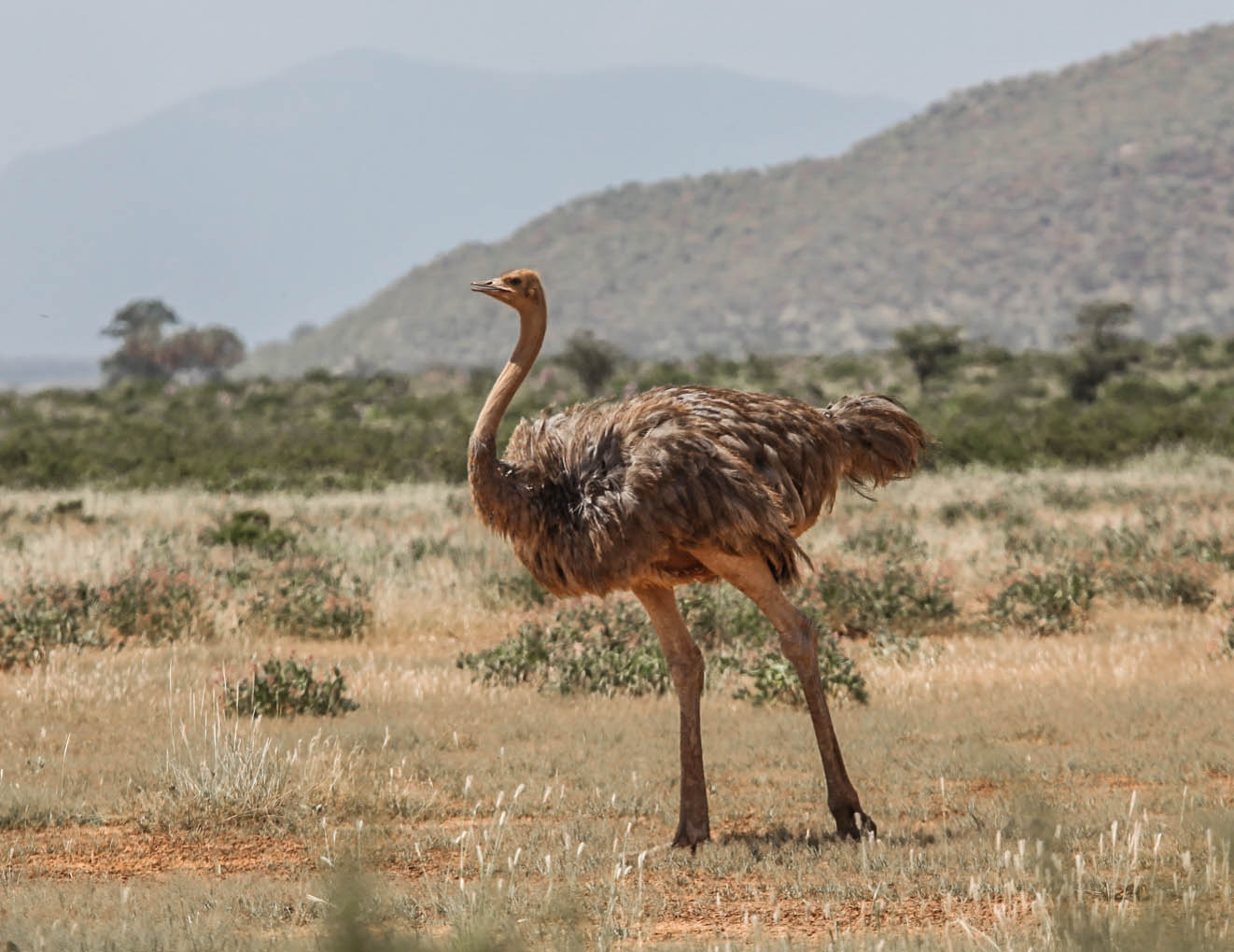
Somali ostrich

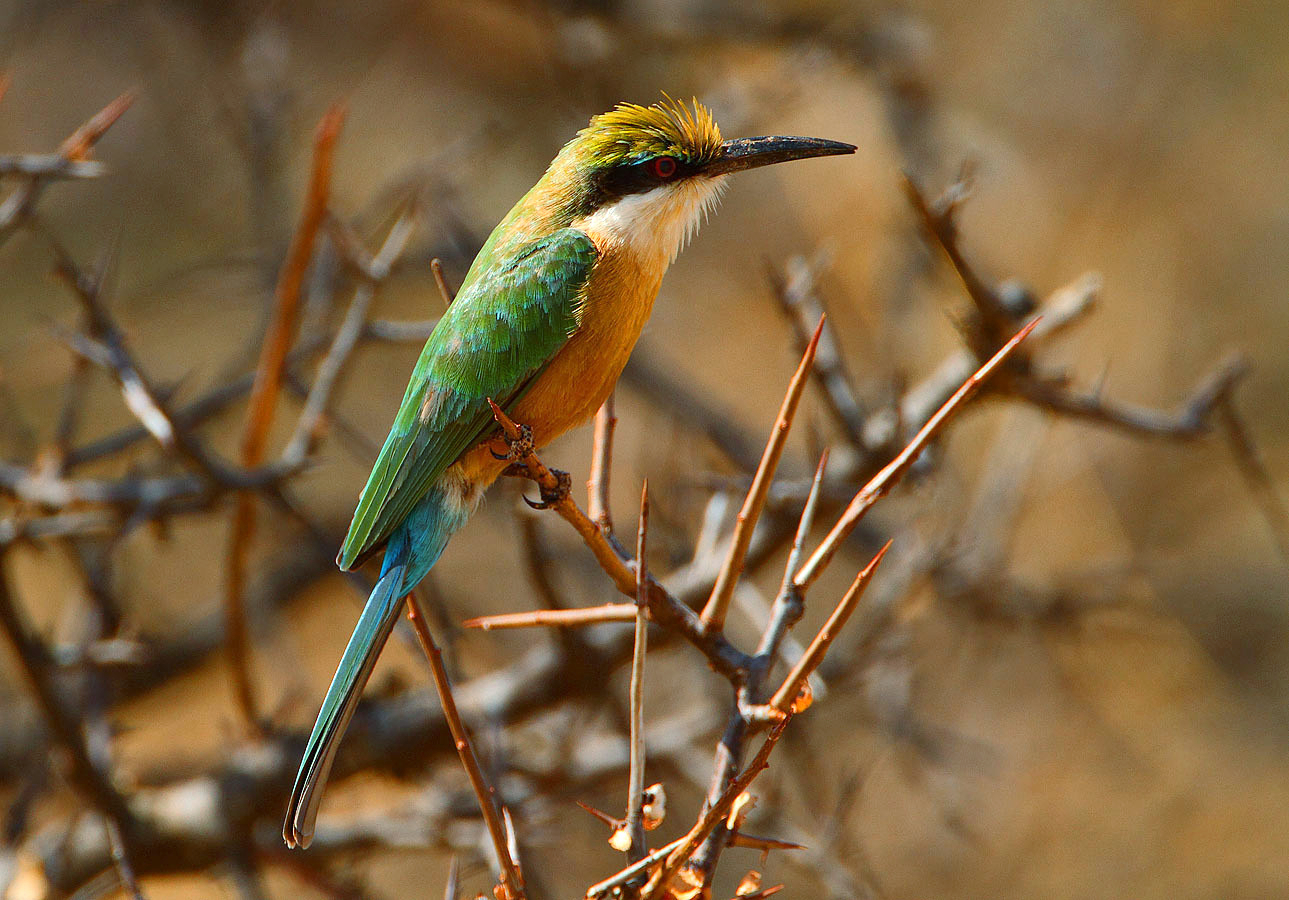
Bee-eater

Somaliland is currently home to about 727 bird species, of which ten are endemic to former Somalia, one has been introduced by humans and one is rare or accidental. Fourteen species are globally threatened. The following species of birds are found exclusively in Somalia as a whole:

- Somali pigeon (Columba oliviae)
- Coastal boubou (Laniarius nigerrimus)
- Lesser hoopoe-lark (Alaemon hamertoni)
- Somali lark (Mirafra somalica)
- Sharpe's lark (Mirafra sharpei)
- Ash's lark (Mirafra ashi)
- Obbia lark (Spizocorys obbiensis)
- Somali thrush (Turdus ludoviciae)
- Somali golden-winged grosbeak (Rhynchostruthus louisae)
- Warsangli linnet (Linaria johannis)

=== Reptiles ===
Somaliland has roughly 235 species of reptiles.

Reptiles unique to Somaliland include Hughes' saw-scaled viper, Somali puff adder, Somali carpet viper, Schätti's racer, Scortecci's diadem snake, Somali sand boa, the angled worm lizard, Macfadyen's mastigure, Granchi's leaf-toed gecko, semaphore gecko, and a wall lizard from either Mesalina or Eremias. The colubrid snake Aprosdoketophis andreonei and Haacke-Greer's skink are endemic genera.

=== Fish ===
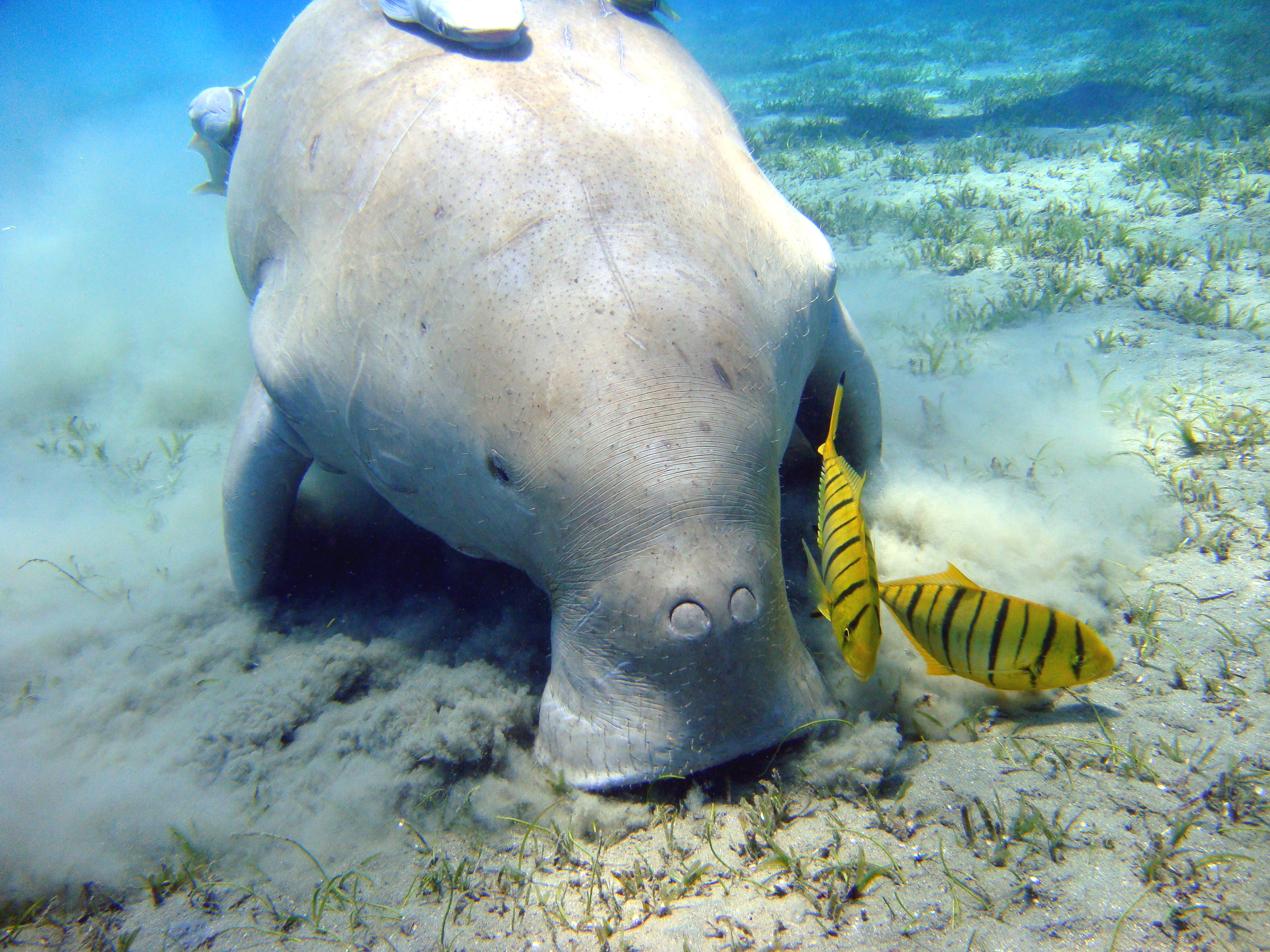
Dugong

With 740 km of coastline facing the Red Sea, Somaliland waters are prime fishing grounds for highly migratory fish species such as tuna and tuna-like species, and a narrow but productive continental shelf is the home to several demersal fish and crustacean species.

Fish species found exclusively in Somaliland include:

- Cirrhitichthys randalli
- Symphurus fuscus
- Parapercis simulata
- Cociella somaliensis
- Pseudochromis melanotus

== Flora ==
The highlands, which in an almost continuous line traverse East Africa, have to a great extent isolated the flora of Somaliland in spite of the general resemblance of its climate and soil to the country on the western side of the band of high ground. The greater part of the country is covered either with tall coarse grasses, or more commonly with thick thorn-bush or jungle, among which rise occasional isolated, trees. The prevalent bush plants are khansa, acacias, aloes, and, especially Boswellia and Commiphora, which yield highly fragrant resins and balsams, such as myrrh, frankincense (olibanum) and balm of Gilead.

Among the larger trees are the mountain cedar, reaching to 100 feet (30 m); the gob, which bears edible berries in appearance something like the cherry with the taste of an apple, grows to some 80 feet (24 m). There are patches of dense reeds, reaching 10 feet (3.0 m) high, and thickets of tamarisk along the river beds, and on either side the jungle is high and more luxuriant than on the open plateau. Of herbaceous plants, the kissenia, the sole representative of the order Loasaceae, which is common in America but very rare elsewhere, is found in Somaliland, which also possesses forms belonging to the eastern Mediterranean flora.

The following vascular plant genera are found exclusively in Somaliland:

- Boswellia occulta (Burseraceae) The new species Boswellia occulta is described from a small area in the El Afweyn District of Somaliland, where it is locally of considerable socio-economic importance. Although used for frankincense production by many generations of local harvesters, it has been unknown to science until now.
- Iphiona rotundifolia (Somali: gagabood)
- Euphorbia inculta (Somali: dibow)
- Odontanthera radians, a member of the family Apocynaceae, which is found in the coastal and subcoastal areas of Somaliland. (Somali: sobkax)
- Balanites rotundifolia (Somali: kulan)
- Boscia miminifolia (Somali: maygaag)
- Vachellia tortilis (Somali: qudhac)
- Eriostylos 1 sp.
- Polyrhabda 1 sp.
- Goydera 1 spp.
- Whitesloanea 1 sp.
- Puccionia 1 sp.
- Afrotrichloris 2 spp.
- Pseudozoysia 1 sp.
- Taeniorhachis 1 sp.
- Renschia 1 sp.
- Symphyochlamys 1 sp.

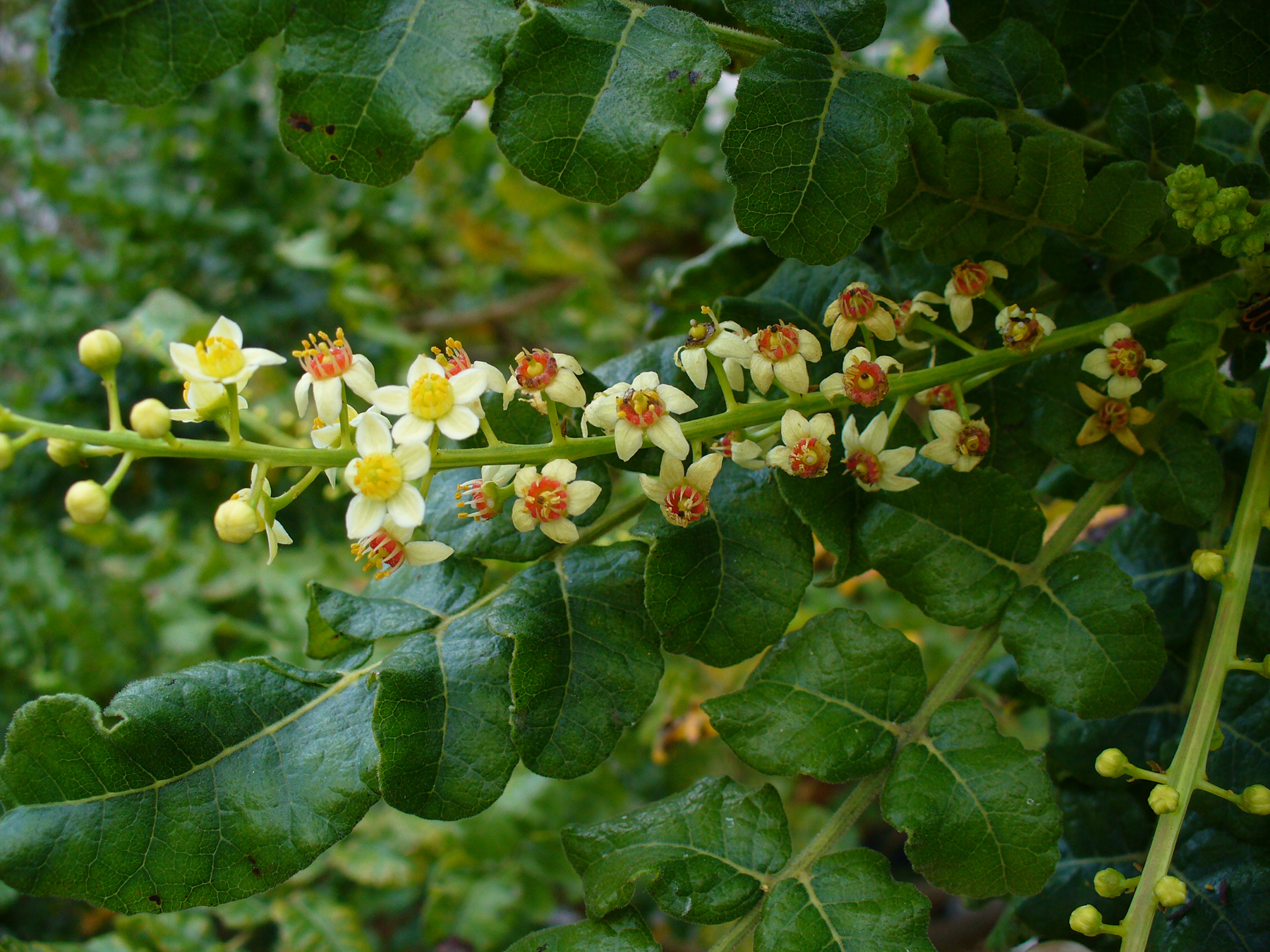
The genus Boswellia, from which frankincense is harvested

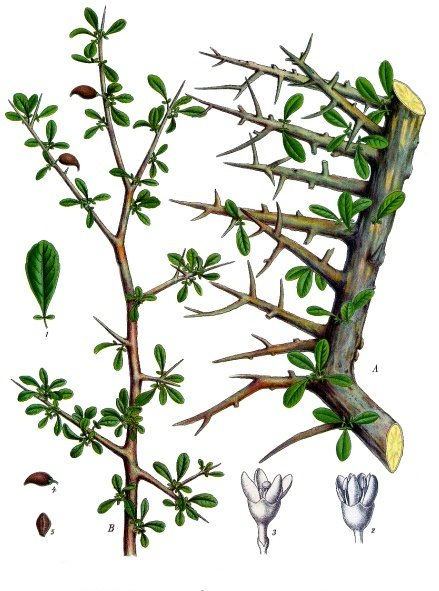
Myrrh

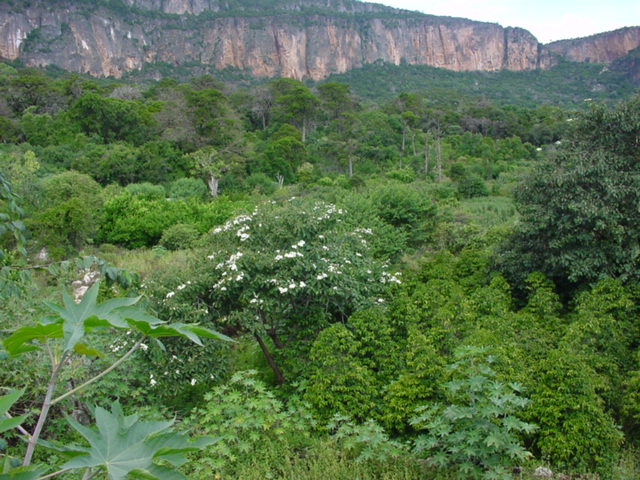
Closeup of Cal Madow's plant species

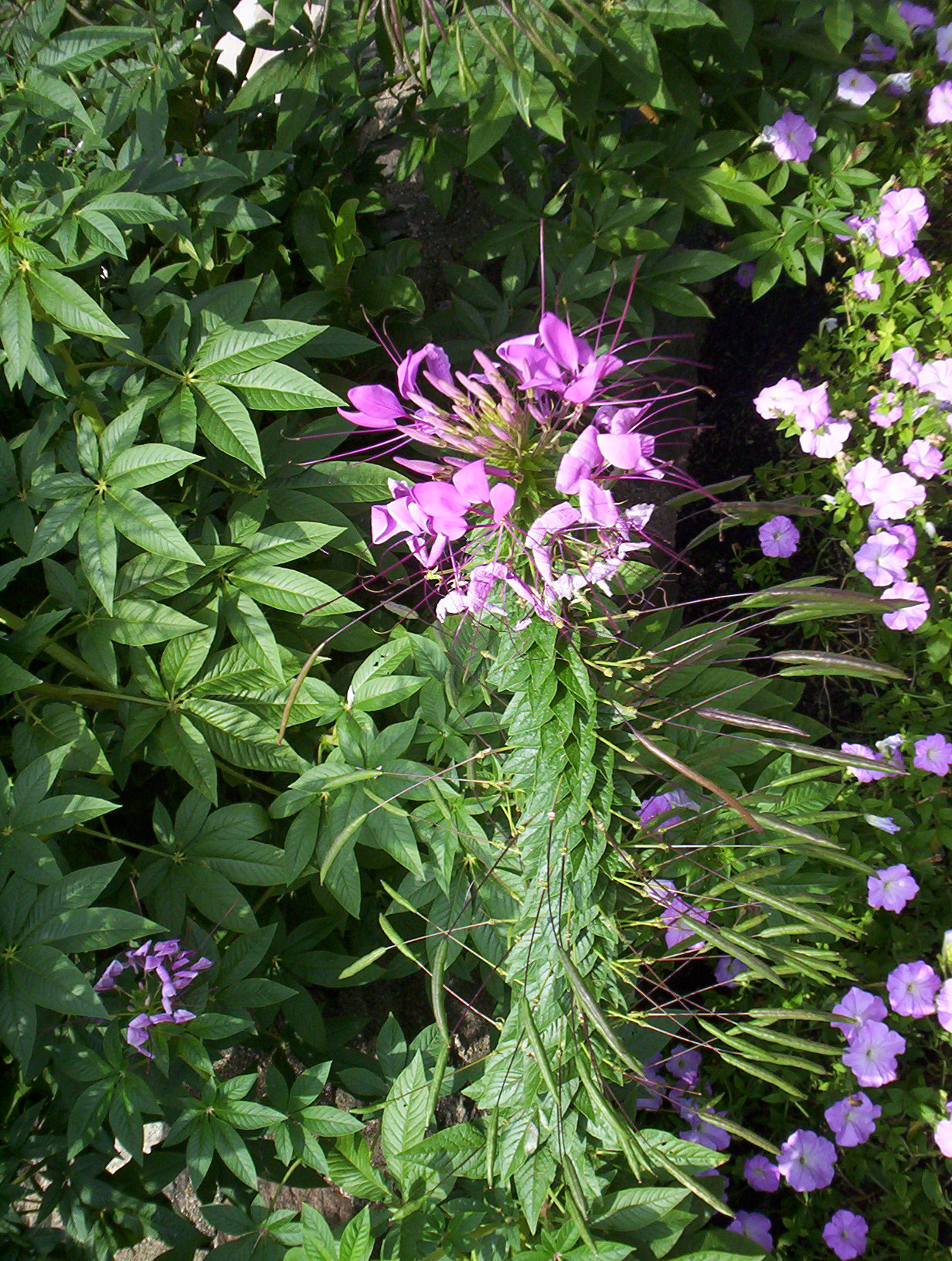
Cleomaceae

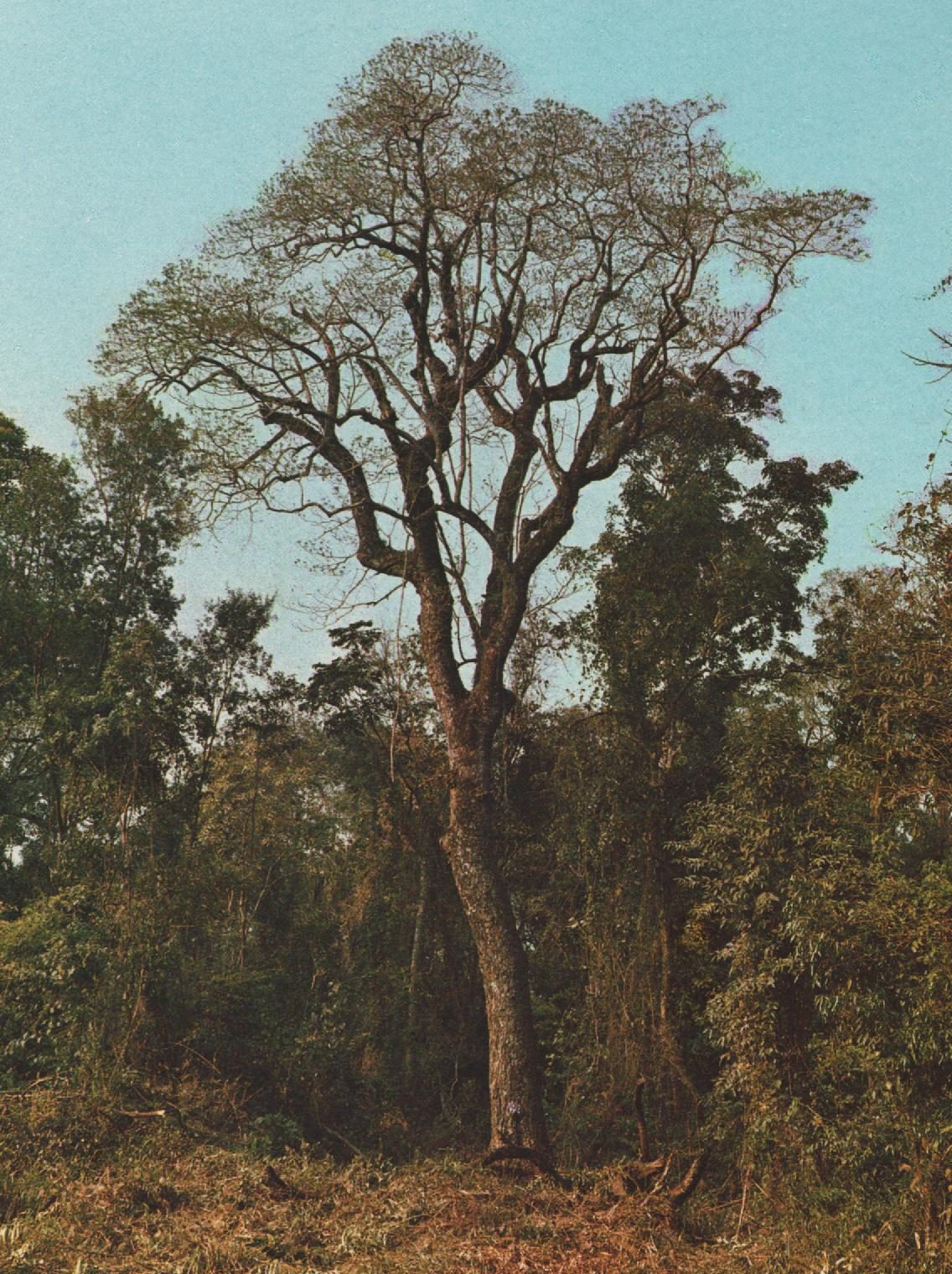
Balsam

== National animals ==
- National animal: kudu
