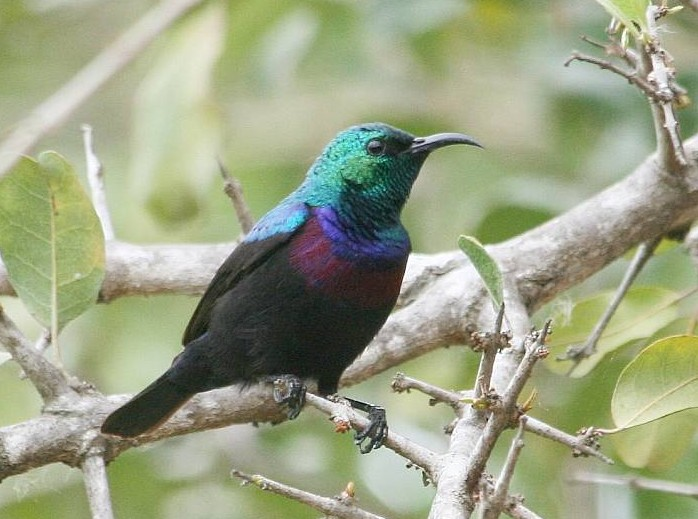
- A male at Ngwenya Resort, Mpumalanga, South Africa.

Conservation status
- Least Concern (IUCN 3.1)

Scientific classification
- Kingdom: Animalia
- Phylum: Chordata
- Class: Aves
- Order: Passeriformes
- Family: Nectariniidae
- Genus: Cinnyris
- Species: C. bifasciatus

Binomial name
- Cinnyris bifasciatus (Shaw, 1812)

Synonyms
- Nectarinia bifasciata

= Purple-banded sunbird =

Species of bird

The purple-banded sunbird (Cinnyris bifasciatus) is a species of bird in the family Nectariniidae. It is found in Angola, Botswana, Republic of the Congo, Democratic Republic of the Congo, Ethiopia, Eswatini, Gabon, Kenya, Malawi, Mozambique, Namibia, Rwanda, Somalia, South Africa, Tanzania, Uganda, Zambia, and Zimbabwe.

The Tsavo sunbird, sometimes lumped with the purple-banded, is here considered a separate species.
