= Conomitra linearis =

Scientific classification
- Kingdom: Plantae
- Clade: Tracheophytes
- Clade: Angiosperms
- Clade: Eudicots
- Clade: Asterids
- Order: Gentianales
- Family: Apocynaceae
- Tribe: Ceropegieae
- Genus: Conomitra; Fenzl
- Species: C. linearis

Binomial name
- Conomitra linearis Fenzl

Synonyms
- Glossonema lineare (Fenzl) Decne.; Odontanthera linearis (Fenzl) Mabb.

Species of plant

Conomitra is a genus of plant in the family Apocynaceae first described in 1839. It contains only one known species, Conomitra linearis, an annual native to Africa, from Niger to Somalia.
