= List of birds of Somalia =

This is a list of the bird species recorded in Somalia. The avifauna of Somalia include a total of 685 species, of which 107 accidentally or rarely cross over to Somalia, 10 are endemic, and 3 have been introduced by humans.

This list's taxonomic treatment (designation and sequence of orders, families and species) and nomenclature (common and scientific names) follow the conventions of The Clements Checklist of Birds of the World, 2022 edition. The family accounts at the beginning of each heading reflect this taxonomy, as do the species counts found in each family account. Introduced and accidental species are included in the total counts for Somalia.

The following tags have been used to highlight several categories, but not all species fall into one of these categories.

- (A) Accidental - a species that rarely or accidentally occurs in Somalia
- (E) Endemic - a species endemic to Somalia
- (I) Introduced - a species introduced to Somalia as a consequence, direct or indirect, of human actions

== Ostriches ==
Order: Struthioniformes Family: Struthionidae

The ostrich is a flightless bird native to Africa. It is the largest living species of bird. It is distinctive in its appearance, with a long neck and legs and the ability to run at high speeds.

- Common ostrich, Struthio camelus
- Somali ostrich, Struthio molybdophanes

== Ducks, geese, and waterfowl ==
Order: Anseriformes Family: Anatidae

Anatidae includes the ducks and most duck-like waterfowl, such as geese and swans. These birds are adapted to an aquatic existence with webbed feet, flattened bills, and feathers that are excellent at shedding water due to an oily coating.

- White-faced whistling-duck, Dendrocygna viduata
- Fulvous whistling-duck, Dendrocygna bicolor
- White-backed duck, Thalassornis leuconotus (A)
- Knob-billed duck, Sarkidiornis melanotos
- Egyptian goose, Alopochen aegyptiacus
- Ruddy shelduck, Tadorna ferruginea (A)
- African pygmy-goose, Nettapus auritus
- Garganey, Spatula querquedula
- Blue-billed teal, Spatula hottentota (A)
- Northern shoveler, Spatula clypeata
- Gadwall, Mareca strepera (A)
- Eurasian wigeon, Mareca penelope (A)
- Yellow-billed duck, Anas undulata (A)
- Red-billed duck, Anas erythrorhyncha
- Northern pintail, Anas acuta
- Green-winged teal, Anas crecca
- Southern pochard, Netta erythrophthalma
- Tufted duck, Aythya fuligula (A)

== Guineafowl ==
Order: Galliformes Family: Numididae

Guineafowl are a group of African, seed-eating, ground-nesting birds that resemble partridges, but with featherless heads and spangled grey plumage.

- Helmeted guineafowl, Numida meleagris
- Vulturine guineafowl, Acryllium vulturinum
- Eastern crested guineafowl, Guttera pucherani

== Pheasants, grouse, and allies ==
Order: Galliformes Family: Phasianidae

The Phasianidae are a family of terrestrial birds which consists of quails, partridges, snowcocks, francolins, spurfowls, tragopans, monals, pheasants, peafowls and jungle fowls. In general, they are plump (although they vary in size) and have broad, relatively short wings.

- Crested francolin, Ortygornis sephaena
- Orange River francolin, Scleroptila gutturalis
- Common quail, Coturnix coturnix (A)
- Harlequin quail, Coturnix delegorguei
- Chestnut-naped francolin, Pternistis castaneicollis
- Yellow-necked spurfowl, Pternistis leucoscepus

== Flamingos ==
Order: Phoenicopteriformes Family: Phoenicopteridae

Flamingos are gregarious wading birds, usually 3 to 5 feet (0.9 to 1.5 m) tall, found in both the Western and Eastern Hemispheres. Flamingos filter-feed on shellfish and algae. Their oddly shaped beaks are specially adapted to separate mud and silt from the food they consume and, uniquely, are used upside-down.

- Greater flamingo, Phoenicopterus roseus
- Lesser flamingo, Phoenicopterus minor (A)

== Grebes ==
Order: Podicipediformes Family: Podicipedidae

Grebes are small to medium-large freshwater diving birds. They have lobed toes and are excellent swimmers and divers. However, they have their feet placed far back on the body, making them quite ungainly on land.

- Little grebe, Tachybaptus ruficollis
- Eared grebe, Podiceps nigricollis (A)

== Pigeons and doves ==
Order: Columbiformes Family: Columbidae

Pigeons and doves are stout-bodied birds with short necks and short slender bills with a fleshy cere.

- Rock pigeon, Columba livia (I)
- Speckled pigeon, Columba guinea
- Somali pigeon, Columba oliviae (E)
- Rameron pigeon, Columba arquatrix
- European turtle-dove, Streptopelia turtur
- Dusky turtle-dove, Streptopelia lugens
- African collared-dove, Streptopelia roseogrisea
- White-winged collared-dove, Streptopelia reichenowi
- Mourning collared-dove, Streptopelia decipiens
- Red-eyed dove, Streptopelia semitorquata
- Ring-necked dove, Streptopelia capicola
- Laughing dove, Streptopelia senegalensis
- Emerald-spotted wood-dove, Turtur chalcospilos
- Tambourine dove, Turtur tympanistria
- Namaqua dove, Oena capensis
- Bruce's green-pigeon, Treron waalia

== Sandgrouse ==
Order: Pterocliformes Family: Pteroclidae

Sandgrouse have small, pigeon like heads and necks, but sturdy compact bodies. They have long pointed wings and sometimes tails and a fast direct flight. Flocks fly to watering holes at dawn and dusk. Their legs are feathered down to the toes.

- Chestnut-bellied sandgrouse, Pterocles exustus
- Spotted sandgrouse, Pterocles senegallus
- Black-faced sandgrouse, Pterocles decoratus
- Lichtenstein's sandgrouse, Pterocles lichtensteinii

== Bustards ==
Order: Otidiformes Family: Otididae

Bustards are large terrestrial birds mainly associated with dry open country and steppes in the Old World. They are omnivorous and nest on the ground. They walk steadily on strong legs and big toes, pecking for food as they go. They have long broad wings with "fingered" wingtips and striking patterns in flight. Many have interesting mating displays.

- Arabian bustard, Ardeotis arabs (A)
- Kori bustard, Ardeotis kori
- Heuglin's bustard, Neotis heuglinii
- White-bellied bustard, Eupodotis senegalensis
- Little brown bustard, Eupodotis humilis
- Buff-crested bustard, Lophotis gindiana
- Black-bellied bustard, Lissotis melanogaster
- Hartlaub's bustard, Lissotis hartlaubii

== Turacos ==
Order: Musophagiformes Family: Musophagidae

The turacos, plantain eaters and go-away-birds make up the bird family Musophagidae. They are medium-sized arboreal birds. The turacos and plantain eaters are brightly coloured, usually in blue, green or purple. The go-away birds are mostly grey and white.

- Fischer's turaco, Tauraco fischeri
- White-bellied go-away-bird, Corythaixoides leucogaster

== Cuckoos ==
Order: Cuculiformes Family: Cuculidae

The family Cuculidae includes cuckoos, roadrunners and anis. These birds are of variable size with slender bodies, long tails and strong legs. The Old World cuckoos are brood parasites.

- White-browed coucal, Centropus superciliosus
- Green malkoha, Ceuthmochares australis
- Great spotted cuckoo, Clamator glandarius
- Levaillant's cuckoo, Clamator levaillantii (A)
- Pied cuckoo, Clamator jacobinus
- Dideric cuckoo, Chrysococcyx caprius
- Klaas's cuckoo, Chrysococcyx klaas
- Black cuckoo, Cuculus clamosus (A)
- Red-chested cuckoo, Cuculus solitarius (A)
- Lesser cuckoo, Cuculus poliocephalus (A)
- African cuckoo, Cuculus gularis
- Common cuckoo, Cuculus canorus

== Nightjars and allies ==
Order: Caprimulgiformes Family: Caprimulgidae

Nightjars are medium-sized nocturnal birds that usually nest on the ground. They have long wings, short legs and very short bills. Most have small feet, of little use for walking, and long pointed wings. Their soft plumage is camouflaged to resemble bark or leaves.

- Pennant-winged nightjar, Caprimulgus vexillarius (A)
- Standard-winged nightjar, Caprimulgus longipennis (A)
- Eurasian nightjar, Caprimulgus europaeus
- Sombre nightjar, Caprimulgus fraenatus
- Egyptian nightjar, Caprimulgus aegyptius (A)
- Nubian nightjar, Caprimulgus nubicus
- Donaldson-Smith's nightjar, Caprimulgus donaldsoni
- Plain nightjar, Caprimulgus inornatus
- Star-spotted nightjar, Caprimulgus stellatus (A)
- Slender-tailed nightjar, Caprimulgus clarus

== Swifts ==
Order: Caprimulgiformes Family: Apodidae

Swifts are small birds which spend the majority of their lives flying. These birds have very short legs and never settle voluntarily on the ground, perching instead only on vertical surfaces. Many swifts have long swept-back wings which resemble a crescent or boomerang.

- Mottled spinetail, Telacanthura ussheri (A)
- Bat-like spinetail, Neafrapus boehmi (A)
- Alpine swift, Apus melba
- Common swift, Apus apus (A)
- Nyanza swift, Apus niansae
- Forbes-Watson's swift, Apus berliozi
- Little swift, Apus affinis
- Horus swift, Apus horus (A)
- White-rumped swift, Apus caffer
- African palm-swift, Cypsiurus parvus

== Flufftails ==
Order: Gruiformes Family: Sarothruridae

The flufftails are a small family of ground-dwelling birds found only in Madagascar and sub-Saharan Africa.

- Buff-spotted flufftail, Sarothrura elegans (A)

== Rails, gallinules, and coots ==
Order: Gruiformes Family: Rallidae

Rallidae is a large family of small to medium-sized birds which includes the rails, crakes, coots and gallinules. Typically they inhabit dense vegetation in damp environments near lakes, swamps or rivers. In general they are shy and secretive birds, making them difficult to observe. Most species have strong legs and long toes which are well adapted to soft uneven surfaces. They tend to have short, rounded wings and to be weak fliers.

- Corn crake, Crex crex (A)
- Spotted crake, Porzana porzana (A)
- Eurasian moorhen, Gallinula chloropus
- Red-knobbed coot, Fulica cristata (A)
- Allen's gallinule, Porphyrio alleni (A)
- African swamphen, Porphyrio madagascariensis (A)
- Black crake, Zapornia flavirostris
- Little crake, Zapornia parva (A)
- Baillon's crake, Zapornia pusilla (A)

== Finfoots ==
Order: Gruiformes Family: Heliornithidae

Heliornithidae is a small family of tropical birds with webbed lobes on their feet similar to those of grebes and coots.

- African finfoot, Podica senegalensis (A)

== Thick-knees ==
Order: Charadriiformes Family: Burhinidae

The thick-knees are a group of largely tropical waders in the family Burhinidae. They are found worldwide within the tropical zone, with some species also breeding in temperate Europe and Australia. They are medium to large waders with strong black or yellow-black bills, large yellow eyes and cryptic plumage. Despite being classed as waders, most species have a preference for arid or semi-arid habitats.

- Water thick-knee, Burhinus vermiculatus
- Eurasian thick-knee, Burhinus oedicnemus
- Indian thick-knee, Burhinus indicus (A)
- Senegal thick-knee, Burhinus senegalensis (A)
- Spotted thick-knee, Burhinus capensis

== Stilts and avocets ==
Order: Charadriiformes Family: Recurvirostridae

Recurvirostridae is a family of large wading birds, which includes the avocets and stilts. The avocets have long legs and long up-curved bills. The stilts have extremely long legs and long, thin, straight bills.

- Black-winged stilt, Himantopus himantopus
- Pied avocet, Recurvirostra avosetta

== Oystercatchers ==
Order: Charadriiformes Family: Haematopodidae

The oystercatchers are large and noisy plover-like birds, with strong bills used for smashing or prising open molluscs.

- Eurasian oystercatcher, Haematopus ostralegus

== Plovers and lapwings ==
Order: Charadriiformes Family: Charadriidae

The family Charadriidae includes the plovers, dotterels and lapwings. They are small to medium-sized birds with compact bodies, short, thick necks and long, usually pointed, wings. They are found in open country worldwide, mostly in habitats near water.

- Black-bellied plover, Pluvialis squatarola
- Pacific golden-plover, Pluvialis fulva
- Spur-winged lapwing, Vanellus spinosus
- Black-headed lapwing, Vanellus tectus
- Senegal lapwing, Vanellus lugubris
- Black-winged lapwing, Vanellus melanopterus (A)
- Crowned lapwing, Vanellus coronatus
- Wattled lapwing, Vanellus senegallus (A)
- Sociable lapwing, Vanellus gregarius (A)
- Lesser sand-plover, Charadrius mongolus
- Greater sand-plover, Charadrius leschenaultii
- Caspian plover, Charadrius asiaticus
- Kittlitz's plover, Charadrius pecuarius
- Kentish plover, Charadrius alexandrinus
- Common ringed plover, Charadrius hiaticula
- Little ringed plover, Charadrius dubius
- Three-banded plover, Charadrius tricollaris
- White-fronted plover, Charadrius marginatus

== Painted-snipes ==
Order: Charadriiformes Family: Rostratulidae

Painted-snipes are short-legged, long-billed birds similar in shape to the true snipes, but more brightly coloured.

- Greater painted-snipe, Rostratula benghalensis

== Jacanas ==
Order: Charadriiformes Family: Jacanidae

The jacanas are a group of tropical waders in the family Jacanidae. They are found throughout the tropics. They are identifiable by their huge feet and claws which enable them to walk on floating vegetation in the shallow lakes that are their preferred habitat.

- African jacana, Actophilornis africanus

== Sandpipers and allies ==
Order: Charadriiformes Family: Scolopacidae

Scolopacidae is a large diverse family of small to medium-sized shorebirds including the sandpipers, curlews, godwits, shanks, tattlers, woodcocks, snipes, dowitchers and phalaropes. The majority of these species eat small invertebrates picked out of the mud or soil. Variation in length of legs and bills enables multiple species to feed in the same habitat, particularly on the coast, without direct competition for food.

- Whimbrel, Numenius phaeopus
- Eurasian curlew, Numenius arquata
- Bar-tailed godwit, Limosa lapponica
- Black-tailed godwit, Limosa limosa
- Ruddy turnstone, Arenaria interpres
- Red knot, Calidris canutus (A)
- Ruff, Calidris pugnax
- Broad-billed sandpiper, Calidris falcinellus (A)
- Curlew sandpiper, Calidris ferruginea
- Temminck's stint, Calidris temminckii
- Red-necked stint, Calidris ruficollis (A)
- Sanderling, Calidris alba
- Dunlin, Calidris alpina
- Little stint, Calidris minuta
- Jack snipe, Lymnocryptes minimus (A)
- Great snipe, Gallinago media (A)
- Common snipe, Gallinago gallinago
- Pin-tailed snipe, Gallinago stenura (A)
- Terek sandpiper, Xenus cinereus
- Red-necked phalarope, Phalaropus lobatus
- Common sandpiper, Actitis hypoleucos
- Green sandpiper, Tringa ochropus
- Spotted redshank, Tringa erythropus
- Common greenshank, Tringa nebularia
- Marsh sandpiper, Tringa stagnatilis
- Wood sandpiper, Tringa glareola
- Common redshank, Tringa totanus

== Buttonquails ==
Order: Charadriiformes Family: Turnicidae

The buttonquails are small, drab, running birds which resemble the true quails. The female is the brighter of the sexes and initiates courtship. The male incubates the eggs and tends the young.

- Small buttonquail, Turnix sylvatica

== Crab-plover ==
Order: Charadriiformes Family: Dromadidae

The crab-plover is related to the waders. It resembles a plover but with very long grey legs and a strong heavy black bill similar to a tern. It has black-and-white plumage, a long neck, partially webbed feet and a bill designed for eating crabs.

- Crab-plover, Dromas ardeola

== Pratincoles and coursers ==
Order: Charadriiformes Family: Glareolidae

Glareolidae is a family of wading birds comprising the pratincoles, which have short legs, long pointed wings and long forked tails, and the coursers, which have long legs, short wings and long, pointed bills which curve downwards.

- Cream-colored courser, Cursorius cursor
- Somali courser, Cursorius somalensis
- Temminck's courser, Cursorius temminckii
- Double-banded courser, Smutsornis africanus
- Three-banded courser, Rhinoptilus cinctus
- Collared pratincole, Glareola pratincola
- Black-winged pratincole, Glareola nordmanni (A)
- Madagascar pratincole, Glareola ocularis

== Skuas and jaegers ==
Order: Charadriiformes Family: Stercorariidae

The family Stercorariidae are, in general, medium to large birds, typically with grey or brown plumage, often with white markings on the wings. They nest on the ground in temperate and arctic regions and are long-distance migrants.

- South polar skua, Stercorarius maccormicki (A)
- Brown skua, Stercorarius antarctica (A)
- Pomarine jaeger, Stercorarius pomarinus (A)
- Parasitic jaeger, Stercorarius parasiticus

== Gulls, terns, and skimmers ==
Order: Charadriiformes Family: Laridae

Laridae is a family of medium to large seabirds, the gulls, terns, and skimmers. Gulls are typically grey or white, often with black markings on the head or wings. They have stout, longish bills and webbed feet. Terns are a group of generally medium to large seabirds typically with grey or white plumage, often with black markings on the head. Most terns hunt fish by diving but some pick insects off the surface of fresh water. Terns are generally long-lived birds, with several species known to live in excess of 30 years. Skimmers are a small family of tropical tern-like birds. They have an elongated lower mandible which they use to feed by flying low over the water surface and skimming the water for small fish.

- Sabine's gull, Xema sabini
- Gray-hooded gull, Chroicocephalus cirrocephalus (A)
- Black-headed gull, Chroicocephalus ridibundus
- White-eyed gull, Ichthyaetus leucophthalmus
- Sooty gull, Ichthyaetus hemprichii
- Pallas's gull, Ichthyaetus ichthyaetus (A)
- Caspian gull, Larus cachinnans
- Lesser black-backed gull, Larus fuscus
- Brown noddy, Anous stolidus
- Lesser noddy, Anous tenuirostris
- Sooty tern, Onychoprion fuscatus
- Bridled tern, Onychoprion anaethetus
- Little tern, Sternula albifrons
- Saunders's tern, Sternula saundersi
- Gull-billed tern, Gelochelidon nilotica
- Caspian tern, Hydroprogne caspia
- Black tern, Chlidonias niger (A)
- White-winged tern, Chlidonias leucopterus
- Whiskered tern, Chlidonias hybrida
- Roseate tern, Sterna dougallii
- Common tern, Sterna hirundo
- Arctic tern, Sterna paradisaea
- White-cheeked tern, Sterna repressa
- Great crested tern, Thalasseus bergii
- Sandwich tern, Thalasseus sandvicensis
- Lesser crested tern, Thalasseus bengalensis
- African skimmer, Rynchops flavirostris (A)

== Tropicbirds ==
Order: Phaethontiformes Family: Phaethontidae

Tropicbirds are slender white birds of tropical oceans, with exceptionally long central tail feathers. Their heads and long wings have black markings.

- Red-billed tropicbird, Phaethon aethereus

== Albatrosses ==
Order: Procellariiformes Family: Diomedeidae

The albatrosses are among the largest of flying birds, and the great albatrosses from the genus Diomedea have the largest wingspans of any extant birds.

- White-capped albatross, Thalassarche cauta (A)

== Southern storm-petrels ==
Order: Procellariiformes Family: Oceanitidae

The southern storm-petrels are relatives of the petrels and are the smallest seabirds. They feed on planktonic crustaceans and small fish picked from the surface, typically while hovering. The flight is fluttering and sometimes bat-like.

- Wilson's storm-petrel, Oceanites oceanicus
- White-faced storm-petrel, Pelagodroma marina (A)
- Black-bellied storm-petrel, Fregetta tropica (A)

== Northern storm-petrels ==
Order: Procellariiformes Family: Hydrobatidae

Though the members of this family are similar in many respects to the southern storm-petrels, including their general appearance and habits, there are enough genetic differences to warrant their placement in a separate family.

- Swinhoe's storm-petrel, Hydrobates monorhis

== Shearwaters and petrels ==
Order: Procellariiformes Family: Procellariidae

The procellariids are the main group of medium-sized "true petrels", characterised by united nostrils with medium septum and a long outer functional primary.

- Cape petrel, Daption capense (A)
- Kerguelen petrel, Aphrodroma brevirostris (A)
- Antarctic prion, Pachyptila desolata (A)
- Jouanin's petrel, Bulweria fallax
- Flesh-footed shearwater, Ardenna carneipes (A)
- Wedge-tailed shearwater, Ardenna pacificus
- Tropical shearwater, Puffinus bailloni
- Persian shearwater, Puffinus persicus

== Storks ==
Order: Ciconiiformes Family: Ciconiidae

Storks are large, long-legged, long-necked, wading birds with long, stout bills. Storks are mute, but bill-clattering is an important mode of communication at the nest. Their nests can be large and may be reused for many years. Many species are migratory.

- African openbill, Anastomus lamelligerus
- Black stork, Ciconia nigra (A)
- Abdim's stork, Ciconia abdimii
- African woolly-necked stork, Ciconia microscelis
- White stork, Ciconia ciconia
- Saddle-billed stork, Ephippiorhynchus senegalensis
- Marabou stork, Leptoptilos crumenifer
- Yellow-billed stork, Mycteria ibis

== Frigatebirds ==
Order: Suliformes Family: Fregatidae

Frigatebirds are large seabirds usually found over tropical oceans. They are large, black-and-white or completely black, with long wings and deeply forked tails. The males have coloured inflatable throat pouches. They do not swim or walk and cannot take off from a flat surface. Having the largest wingspan-to-body-weight ratio of any bird, they are essentially aerial, able to stay aloft for more than a week.

- Lesser frigatebird, Fregata ariel (A)
- Great frigatebird, Fregata minor

== Boobies and gannets ==
Order: Suliformes Family: Sulidae

The sulids comprise the gannets and boobies. Both groups are medium to large coastal seabirds that plunge-dive for fish.

- Masked booby, Sula dactylatra
- Brown booby, Sula leucogaster
- Red-footed booby, Sula sula (A)

== Anhingas ==
Order: Suliformes Family: Anhingidae

Anhingas or darters are often called "snake-birds" because of their long thin neck, which gives a snake-like appearance when they swim with their bodies submerged. The males have black and dark-brown plumage, an erectile crest on the nape and a larger bill than the female. The females have much paler plumage especially on the neck and underparts. The darters have completely webbed feet and their legs are short and set far back on the body. Their plumage is somewhat permeable, like that of cormorants, and they spread their wings to dry after diving.

- African darter, Anhinga melanogaster

== Cormorants and shags ==
Order: Suliformes Family: Phalacrocoracidae

Phalacrocoracidae is a family of medium to large coastal, fish-eating seabirds that includes cormorants and shags. Plumage colouration varies, with the majority having mainly dark plumage, some species being black-and-white and a few being colourful.

- Long-tailed cormorant, Microcarbo africanus
- Great cormorant, Phalacrocorax carbo
- Socotra cormorant, Phalacrocorax nigrogularis

== Pelicans ==
Order: Pelecaniformes Family: Pelecanidae

Pelicans are large water birds with a distinctive pouch under their beak. As with other members of the order Pelecaniformes, they have webbed feet with four toes.

- Great white pelican, Pelecanus onocrotalus
- Pink-backed pelican, Pelecanus rufescens

== Hammerkop ==
Order: Pelecaniformes Family: Scopidae

The hammerkop is a medium-sized bird with a long shaggy crest. The shape of its head with a curved bill and crest at the back is reminiscent of a hammer, hence its name. Its plumage is drab-brown all over.

- Hamerkop, Scopus umbretta

== Herons, egrets, and bitterns ==
Order: Pelecaniformes Family: Ardeidae

The family Ardeidae contains the bitterns, herons and egrets. Herons and egrets are medium to large wading birds with long necks and legs. Bitterns tend to be shorter necked and more wary. Members of Ardeidae fly with their necks retracted, unlike other long-necked birds such as storks, ibises and spoonbills.

- Little bittern, Ixobrychus minutus
- Dwarf bittern, Ixobrychus sturmii
- Gray heron, Ardea cinerea (A)
- Black-headed heron, Ardea melanocephala
- Goliath heron, Ardea goliath
- Purple heron, Ardea purpurea
- Great egret, Ardea alba
- Intermediate egret, Ardea intermedia
- Little egret, Egretta garzetta
- Western reef-heron, Egretta gularis
- Black heron, Egretta ardesiaca
- Cattle egret, Bubulcus ibis
- Squacco heron, Ardeola ralloides
- Malagasy pond-heron, Ardeola idae (A)
- Striated heron, Butorides striata
- Black-crowned night-heron, Nycticorax nycticorax

== Ibises and spoonbills ==
Order: Pelecaniformes Family: Threskiornithidae

Threskiornithidae is a family of large terrestrial and wading birds which includes the ibises and spoonbills. They have long, broad wings with 11 primary and about 20 secondary feathers. They are strong fliers and despite their size and weight, very capable soarers.

- Glossy ibis, Plegadis falcinellus
- African sacred ibis, Threskiornis aethiopicus
- Northern bald ibis, Geronticus eremita (A)
- Hadada ibis, Bostrychia hagedash
- Eurasian spoonbill, Platalea leucorodia
- African spoonbill, Platalea alba

== Secretarybird ==
Order: Accipitriformes Family: Sagittariidae

The secretarybird is a bird of prey in the order Accipitriformes but is easily distinguished from other raptors by its long crane-like legs.

- Secretarybird, Sagittarius serpentarius

== Osprey ==
Order: Accipitriformes Family: Pandionidae

The family Pandionidae contains only one species, the osprey. The osprey is a medium-large raptor which is a specialist fish-eater with a worldwide distribution.

- Osprey, Pandion haliaetus

== Hawks, eagles, and kites ==
Order: Accipitriformes Family: Accipitridae

Accipitridae is a family of birds of prey, which includes hawks, eagles, kites, harriers and Old World vultures. These birds have powerful hooked beaks for tearing flesh from their prey, strong legs, powerful talons and keen eyesight.

- Black-winged kite, Elanus caeruleus
- Scissor-tailed kite, Chelictinia riocourii
- African harrier-hawk, Polyboroides typus
- Egyptian vulture, Neophron percnopterus
- European honey-buzzard, Pernis apivorus (A)
- African cuckoo-hawk, Aviceda cuculoides
- White-headed vulture, Trigonoceps occipitalis
- Lappet-faced vulture, Torgos tracheliotos
- Hooded vulture, Necrosyrtes monachus
- White-backed vulture, Gyps africanus
- Rüppell's griffon, Gyps rueppelli
- Eurasian griffon, Gyps fulvus (A)
- Bateleur, Terathopius ecaudatus
- Short-toed snake-eagle, Circaetus gallicus (A)
- Black-chested snake-eagle, Circaetus pectoralis
- Brown snake-eagle, Circaetus cinereus
- Fasciated snake-eagle, Circaetus fasciolatus
- Bat hawk, Macheiramphus alcinus
- Martial eagle, Polemaetus bellicosus
- Long-crested eagle, Lophaetus occipitalis
- Wahlberg's eagle, Hieraaetus wahlbergi
- Booted eagle, Hieraaetus pennatus
- Ayres's hawk-eagle, Hieraaetus ayresii (A)
- Tawny eagle, Aquila rapax
- Steppe eagle, Aquila nipalensis (A)
- Verreaux's eagle, Aquila verreauxii
- Bonelli's eagle, Aquila fasciata (A)
- African hawk-eagle, Aquila spilogaster
- Lizard buzzard, Kaupifalco monogrammicus
- Eastern chanting-goshawk, Melierax poliopterus
- Gabar goshawk, Micronisus gabar
- Grasshopper buzzard, Butastur rufipennis
- Eurasian marsh-harrier, Circus aeruginosus
- African marsh-harrier, Circus ranivorus (A)
- Pallid harrier, Circus macrourus
- Montagu's harrier, Circus pygargus
- African goshawk, Accipiter tachiro
- Shikra, Accipiter badius
- Little sparrowhawk, Accipiter minullus
- Eurasian sparrowhawk, Accipiter nisus (A)
- Black goshawk, Accipiter melanoleucus (A)
- Black kite, Milvus migrans
- Yellow-billed kite, Milvus aegyptius
- African fish-eagle, Haliaeetus vocifer
- Common buzzard, Buteo buteo (A)
- Long-legged buzzard, Buteo rufinus (A)
- Augur buzzard, Buteo augur

== Barn-owls ==
Order: Strigiformes Family: Tytonidae

Barn-owls are medium to large owls with large heads and characteristic heart-shaped faces. They have long strong legs with powerful talons.

- Western barn owl, Tyto alba

== Owls ==
Order: Strigiformes Family: Strigidae

The typical owls are small to large solitary nocturnal birds of prey. They have large forward-facing eyes and ears, a hawk-like beak and a conspicuous circle of feathers around each eye called a facial disk.

- Eurasian scops-owl, Otus scops
- African scops-owl, Otus senegalensis
- Northern white-faced owl, Ptilopsis leucotis
- Grayish eagle-owl, Bubo cinerascens
- Verreaux's eagle-owl, Bubo lacteus
- Pel's fishing-owl, Scotopelia peli
- Pearl-spotted owlet, Glaucidium perlatum
- African barred owlet, Glaucidium capense
- Little owl, Athene noctua
- African wood-owl, Strix woodfordii

== Mousebirds ==
Order: Coliiformes Family: Coliidae

The mousebirds are slender greyish or brown birds with soft, hairlike body feathers and very long thin tails. They are arboreal and scurry through the leaves like rodents in search of berries, fruit and buds. They are acrobatic and can feed upside down. All species have strong claws and reversible outer toes. They also have crests and stubby bills.

- Speckled mousebird, Colius striatus
- White-headed mousebird, Colius leucocephalus
- Blue-naped mousebird, Urocolius macrourus

== Trogons ==
Order: Trogoniformes Family: Trogonidae

The family Trogonidae includes trogons and quetzals. Found in tropical woodlands worldwide, they feed on insects and fruit, and their broad bills and weak legs reflect their diet and arboreal habits. Although their flight is fast, they are reluctant to fly any distance. Trogons have soft, often colourful, feathers with distinctive male and female plumage.

- Narina trogon, Apaloderma narina

== Hoopoes ==
Order: Bucerotiformes Family: Upupidae

Hoopoes have black, white and orangey-pink colouring with a large erectile crest on their head.

- Eurasian hoopoe, Upupa epops

== Woodhoopoes and scimitarbills ==
Order: Bucerotiformes Family: Phoeniculidae

The woodhoopoes are related to the kingfishers, rollers and hoopoes. They most resemble the hoopoes with their long curved bills, used to probe for insects, and short rounded wings. However, they differ in that they have metallic plumage, often blue, green or purple, and lack an erectile crest.

- Green woodhoopoe, Phoeniculus purpureus (A)
- Black-billed woodhoopoe, Phoeniculus somaliensis
- Black scimitarbill, Rhinopomastus aterrimus
- Common scimitarbill, Rhinopomastus cyanomelas
- Abyssinian scimitarbill, Rhinopomastus minor

== Ground-hornbills ==
Order: Bucerotiformes Family: Bucorvidae

The ground-hornbills are terrestrial birds which feed almost entirely on insects, other birds, snakes, and amphibians.

- Abyssinian ground-hornbill, Bucorvus abyssinicus

== Hornbills ==
Order: Bucerotiformes Family: Bucerotidae

Hornbills are a group of birds whose bill is shaped like a cow's horn, but without a twist, sometimes with a casque on the upper mandible. Frequently, the bill is brightly coloured.

- Crowned hornbill, Lophoceros alboterminatus
- Hemprich's hornbill, Lophoceros hemprichii
- African gray hornbill, Lophoceros nasutus
- Eastern yellow-billed hornbill, Tockus flavirostris
- Von der Decken's hornbill, Tockus deckeni
- Northern red-billed hornbill, Tockus erythrorhynchus

== Kingfishers ==
Order: Coraciiformes Family: Alcedinidae

Kingfishers are medium-sized birds with large heads, long, pointed bills, short legs and stubby tails.

- Malachite kingfisher, Corythornis cristatus
- African pygmy kingfisher, Ispidina picta
- Gray-headed kingfisher, Halcyon leucocephala
- Mangrove kingfisher, Halcyon senegaloides
- Brown-hooded kingfisher, Halcyon albiventris
- Striped kingfisher, Halcyon chelicuti
- Collared kingfisher, Todirhamphus chloris
- Pied kingfisher, Ceryle rudis

== Bee-eaters ==
Order: Coraciiformes Family: Meropidae

The bee-eaters are a group of near passerine birds in the family Meropidae. Most species are found in Africa but others occur in southern Europe, Madagascar, Australia and New Guinea. They are characterised by richly coloured plumage, slender bodies and usually elongated central tail feathers. All are colourful and have long downturned bills and pointed wings, which give them a swallow-like appearance when seen from afar.

- Little bee-eater, Merops pusillus
- Somali bee-eater, Merops revoilii
- White-throated bee-eater, Merops albicollis
- Blue-cheeked bee-eater, Merops persicus
- Madagascar bee-eater, Merops superciliosus
- European bee-eater, Merops apiaster
- Northern carmine bee-eater, Merops nubicus

== Rollers ==
Order: Coraciiformes Family: Coraciidae

Rollers resemble crows in size and build, but are more closely related to the kingfishers and bee-eaters. They share the colourful appearance of those groups with blues and browns predominating. The two inner front toes are connected, but the outer toe is not.

- European roller, Coracias garrulus
- Abyssinian roller, Coracias abyssinica (A)
- Lilac-breasted roller, Coracias caudata
- Rufous-crowned roller, Coracias naevia
- Broad-billed roller, Eurystomus glaucurus

== African barbets ==
Order: Piciformes Family: Lybiidae

The African barbets are plump birds, with short necks and large heads. They get their name from the bristles which fringe their heavy bills. Most species are brightly coloured.

- Red-and-yellow barbet, Trachyphonus erythrocephalus
- Yellow-breasted barbet, Trachyphonus margaritatus
- D'Arnaud's barbet, Trachyphonus darnaudii
- Red-fronted tinkerbird, Pogoniulus pusillus
- Black-throated barbet, Tricholaema melanocephala
- Brown-breasted barbet, Lybius melanopterus

== Honeyguides ==
Order: Piciformes Family: Indicatoridae

Honeyguides are among the few birds that feed on wax. They are named for the greater honeyguide which leads traditional honey-hunters to bees' nests and, after the hunters have harvested the honey, feeds on the remaining contents of the hive.

- Wahlberg's honeyguide, Prodotiscus regulus (A)
- Lesser honeyguide, Indicator minor
- Scaly-throated honeyguide, Indicator variegatus
- Greater honeyguide, Indicator indicator

== Woodpeckers ==
Order: Piciformes Family: Picidae

Woodpeckers are small to medium-sized birds with chisel-like beaks, short legs, stiff tails and long tongues used for capturing insects. Some species have feet with two toes pointing forward and two backward, while several species have only three toes. Many woodpeckers have the habit of tapping noisily on tree trunks with their beaks.

- Eurasian wryneck, Jynx torquilla (A)
- Cardinal woodpecker, Dendropicos fuscescens
- Bearded woodpecker, Chloropicus namaquus
- Green-backed woodpecker, Campethera cailliautii
- Nubian woodpecker, Campethera nubica
- Mombasa woodpecker, Campethera mombassica

== Falcons and caracaras ==
Order: Falconiformes Family: Falconidae

Falconidae is a family of diurnal birds of prey. They differ from hawks, eagles and kites in that they kill with their beaks instead of their talons.

- Pygmy falcon, Polihierax semitorquatus
- Lesser kestrel, Falco naumanni
- Eurasian kestrel, Falco tinnunculus
- Greater kestrel, Falco rupicoloides
- Red-necked falcon, Falco chicquera (A)
- Red-footed falcon, Falco vespertinus (A)
- Amur falcon, Falco amurensis
- Eleonora's falcon, Falco eleonorae
- Sooty falcon, Falco concolor
- Eurasian hobby, Falco subbuteo
- African hobby, Falco cuvierii (A)
- Lanner falcon, Falco biarmicus
- Peregrine falcon, Falco peregrinus

== Old World parrots ==
Order: Psittaciformes Family: Psittaculidae

Characteristic features of parrots include a strong curved bill, an upright stance, strong legs, and clawed zygodactyl feet. Many parrots are vividly colored, and some are multi-colored. In size they range from 8 cm (3.1 in) to 1 m (3.3 ft) in length. Old World parrots are found from Africa east across south and southeast Asia and Oceania to Australia and New Zealand.

- Rose-ringed parakeet, Psittacula krameri (A)

== African and New World parrots ==
Order: Psittaciformes Family: Psittacidae

Characteristic features of parrots include a strong curved bill, an upright stance, strong legs, and clawed zygodactyl feet. Many parrots are vividly colored, and some are multi-colored. In size they range from 8 cm (3.1 in) to 1 m (3.3 ft) in length. Most of the more than 150 species in this family are found in the New World.

- Red-bellied parrot, Poicephalus rufiventris

== Cuckooshrikes ==
Order: Passeriformes Family: Campephagidae

The cuckooshrikes are small to medium-sized passerine birds. They are predominantly greyish with white and black, although some species are brightly coloured.

- Black cuckooshrike, Campephaga flava

== Old World orioles ==
Order: Passeriformes Family: Oriolidae

The Old World orioles are colourful passerine birds. They are not related to the New World orioles.

- Eurasian golden oriole, Oriolus oriolus
- African golden oriole, Oriolus auratus
- African black-headed oriole, Oriolus larvatus

== Wattle-eyes and batises ==
Order: Passeriformes Family: Platysteiridae

The wattle-eyes, or puffback flycatchers, are small stout passerine birds of the African tropics. They get their name from the brightly coloured fleshy eye decorations found in most species in this group.

- Black-throated wattle-eye, Platysteira peltata
- Gray-headed batis, Batis orientalis
- Western black-headed batis, Batis erlangeri
- Eastern black-headed batis, Batis minor
- Pygmy batis, Batis perkeo

== Vangas, helmetshrikes, and allies ==
Order: Passeriformes Family: Vangidae

The helmetshrikes are similar in build to the shrikes, but tend to be colourful species with distinctive crests or other head ornaments, such as wattles, from which they get their name.

- White helmetshrike, Prionops plumatus
- Retz's helmetshrike, Prionops retzii
- Chestnut-fronted helmetshrike, Prionops scopifrons

== Bushshrikes and allies ==
Order: Passeriformes Family: Malaconotidae

Bushshrikes are similar in habits to shrikes, hunting insects and other small prey from a perch on a bush. Although similar in build to the shrikes, these tend to be either colourful species or largely black; some species are quite secretive.

- Brubru, Nilaus afer
- Northern puffback, Dryoscopus gambensis
- Pringle's puffback, Dryoscopus pringlii
- Black-backed puffback, Dryoscopus cubla
- Black-crowned tchagra, Tchagra senegala
- Three-streaked tchagra, Tchagra jamesi
- Red-naped bushshrike, Laniarius ruficeps
- Coastal boubou, Laniarius nigerrimus (E)
- Ethiopian boubou, Laniarius aethiopicus
- Zanzibar boubou, Laniarius sublacteus
- Slate-colored boubou, Laniarius funebris
- Rosy-patched bushshrike, Rhodophoneus cruentus
- Sulphur-breasted bushshrike, Telophorus sulfureopectus
- Four-colored bushshrike, Telophorus viridis
- Gray-headed bushshrike, Malaconotus blanchoti

== Drongos ==
Order: Passeriformes Family: Dicruridae

The drongos are mostly black or dark grey in colour, sometimes with metallic tints. They have long forked tails, and some Asian species have elaborate tail decorations. They have short legs and sit very upright when perched, like a shrike. They flycatch or take prey from the ground.

- Common square-tailed drongo, Dicrurus ludwigii
- Fork-tailed drongo, Dicrurus adsimilis
- Glossy-backed drongo, Dicrurus divaricatus

== Monarch flycatchers ==
Order: Passeriformes Family: Monarchidae

The monarch flycatchers are small to medium-sized insectivorous passerines which hunt by flycatching.

- African crested-flycatcher, Trochocercus cyanomelas
- African paradise-flycatcher, Terpsiphone viridis

== Shrikes ==
Order: Passeriformes Family: Laniidae

Shrikes are passerine birds known for their habit of catching other birds and small animals and impaling the uneaten portions of their bodies on thorns. A typical shrike's beak is hooked, like a bird of prey.

- Red-backed shrike, Lanius collurio
- Red-tailed shrike, Lanius phoenicuroides
- Isabelline shrike, Lanius isabellinus
- Great gray shrike, Lanius excubitor
- Lesser gray shrike, Lanius minor
- Long-tailed fiscal, Lanius cabanisi
- Taita fiscal, Lanius dorsalis
- Somali fiscal, Lanius somalicus
- Masked shrike, Lanius nubicus (A)
- Woodchat shrike, Lanius senator (A)
- White-rumped shrike, Eurocephalus ruppelli

== Crows, jays, and magpies ==
Order: Passeriformes Family: Corvidae

The family Corvidae includes crows, ravens, jays, choughs, magpies, treepies, nutcrackers and ground jays. Corvids are above average in size among the Passeriformes, and some of the larger species show high levels of intelligence.

- House crow, Corvus splendens (I)
- Cape crow, Corvus capensis
- Pied crow, Corvus albus
- Brown-necked raven, Corvus ruficollis (A)
- Somali crow, Corvus edithae
- Fan-tailed raven, Corvus rhipidurus
- Thick-billed raven, Corvus crassirostris (A)

== Tits, chickadees and titmice ==
Order: Passeriformes Family: Paridae

The Paridae are mainly small stocky woodland species with short stout bills. Some have crests. They are adaptable birds, with a mixed diet including seeds and insects.

- Somali tit, Melaniparus thruppi

== Penduline-tits ==
Order: Passeriformes Family: Remizidae

The penduline-tits are a group of small passerine birds related to the true tits. They are insectivores.

- Mouse-coloured penduline-tit, Anthoscopus musculus

== Larks ==
Order: Passeriformes Family: Alaudidae

Larks are small terrestrial birds with often extravagant songs and display flights. Most larks are fairly dull in appearance. Their food is insects and seeds.

- Greater hoopoe-lark, Alaemon alaudipes
- Lesser hoopoe-lark, Alaemon hamertoni (E)
- Desert lark, Ammomanes deserti
- Chestnut-backed sparrow-lark, Eremopterix leucotis
- Black-crowned sparrow-lark, Eremopterix nigriceps
- Chestnut-headed sparrow-lark, Eremopterix signata
- Pink-breasted lark, Calendulauda poecilosterna
- Fawn-colored lark, Calendulauda africanoides
- Liben lark, Heteromirafra archeri
- Collared lark, Mirafra collaris
- Sharpe's lark, Corypha sharpii (E)
- Red-winged lark, Mirafra hypermetra
- Rufous-naped lark, Mirafra africana
- Somali lark, Corypha somalica (E)
- Flappet lark, Mirafra rufocinnamomea
- Horsfield's bushlark, Mirafra javanica
- Gillett's lark, Mirafra gilletti
- Rufous-capped lark, Calandrella eremica
- Greater short-toed lark, Calandrella brachydactyla
- Somali short-toed lark, Alaudala somalica
- Short-tailed lark, Spizocorys fremantlii
- Obbia lark, Spizocorys obbiensis (E)
- Thekla's lark, Galerida theklae
- Crested lark, Galerida cristata

== Nicators ==
Order: Passeriformes Family: Nicatoridae

The nicators are shrike-like, with hooked bills. They are endemic to sub-Saharan Africa.

- Eastern nicator, Nicator gularis

== African warblers ==
Order: Passeriformes Family: Macrosphenidae

African warblers are small to medium-sized insectivores which are found in a wide variety of habitats south of the Sahara.

- Northern crombec, Sylvietta brachyura
- Short-billed crombec, Sylvietta philippae
- Somali crombec, Sylvietta isabellina

== Cisticolas and allies ==
Order: Passeriformes Family: Cisticolidae

The Cisticolidae are warblers found mainly in warmer southern regions of the Old World. They are generally very small birds of drab brown or grey appearance found in open country such as grassland or scrub.

- Yellow-vented eremomela, Eremomela flavicrissalis
- Yellow-bellied eremomela, Eremomela icteropygialis
- Gray wren-warbler, Calamonastes simplex
- Green-backed camaroptera, Camaroptera brachyura
- Yellow-breasted apalis, Apalis flavida
- Black-headed apalis, Apalis melanocephala
- Graceful prinia, Prinia gracilis
- Tawny-flanked prinia, Prinia subflava
- Pale prinia, Prinia somalica
- Red-fronted prinia, Prinia rufifrons
- Ashy cisticola, Cisticola cinereolus
- Coastal cisticola, Cisticola haematocephalus
- Croaking cisticola, Cisticola natalensis
- Siffling cisticola, Cisticola brachypterus
- Tiny cisticola, Cisticola nana
- Zitting cisticola, Cisticola juncidis
- Desert cisticola, Cisticola aridulus
- Pectoral-patch cisticola, Cisticola brunnescens

== Reed warblers and allies ==
Order: Passeriformes Family: Acrocephalidae

The members of this family are usually rather large for "warblers". Most are rather plain olivaceous brown above with much yellow to beige below. They are usually found in open woodland, reedbeds, or tall grass. The family occurs mostly in southern to western Eurasia and surroundings, but it also ranges far into the Pacific, with some species in Africa.

- Booted warbler, Iduna caligata
- Sykes's warbler, Iduna rama
- Eastern olivaceous warbler, Iduna pallida
- Upcher's warbler, Hippolais languida
- Olive-tree warbler, Hippolais olivetorum (A)
- Icterine warbler, Hippolais icterina (A)
- Sedge warbler, Acrocephalus schoenobaenus
- Marsh warbler, Acrocephalus palustris
- Common reed warbler, Acrocephalus scirpaceus
- Basra reed warbler, Acrocephalus griseldis
- Lesser swamp warbler, Acrocephalus gracilirostris
- Great reed warbler, Acrocephalus arundinaceus (A)
- Clamorous reed warbler, Acrocephalus stentoreus

== Grassbirds and allies ==
Order: Passeriformes Family: Locustellidae

Locustellidae are a family of small insectivorous songbirds found mainly in Eurasia, Africa, and the Australian region. They are smallish birds with tails that are usually long and pointed, and tend to be drab brownish or buffy all over.

- River warbler, Locustella fluviatilis (A)

== Swallows ==
Order: Passeriformes Family: Hirundinidae

The family Hirundinidae is adapted to aerial feeding. They have a slender streamlined body, long pointed wings and a short bill with a wide gape. The feet are adapted to perching rather than walking, and the front toes are partially joined at the base.

- Plain martin, Riparia paludicola (A)
- Bank swallow, Riparia riparia
- Banded martin, Neophedina cincta (A)
- Rock martin, Ptyonoprogne fuligula
- Barn swallow, Hirundo rustica
- Ethiopian swallow, Hirundo aethiopica
- Wire-tailed swallow, Hirundo smithii
- Red-rumped swallow, Cecropis daurica
- Lesser striped swallow, Cecropis abyssinica
- Mosque swallow, Cecropis senegalensis (A)
- Common house-martin, Delichon urbicum

== Bulbuls ==
Order: Passeriformes Family: Pycnonotidae

Bulbuls are medium-sized songbirds. Some are colourful with yellow, red or orange vents, cheeks, throats or supercilia, but most are drab, with uniform olive-brown to black plumage. Some species have distinct crests.

- Sombre greenbul, Andropadus importunus
- Yellow-bellied greenbul, Chlorocichla flaviventris
- Terrestrial brownbul, Phyllastrephus terrestris
- Northern brownbul, Phyllastrephus strepitans
- Fischer's greenbul, Phyllastrephus fischeri
- Common bulbul, Pycnonotus barbatus

== Leaf warblers ==
Order: Passeriformes Family: Phylloscopidae

Leaf warblers are a family of small insectivorous birds found mostly in Eurasia and ranging into Wallacea and Africa. The species are of various sizes, often green-plumaged above and yellow below, or more subdued with greyish-green to greyish-brown colours.

- Wood warbler, Phylloscopus sibilatrix
- Willow warbler, Phylloscopus trochilus
- Common chiffchaff, Phylloscopus collybita
- Brown woodland-warbler, Phylloscopus umbrovirens

== Bush warblers and allies ==
Order: Passeriformes Family: Scotocercidae

The members of this family are found throughout Africa, Asia, and Polynesia. Their taxonomy is in flux, and some authorities place genus Erythrocerus in another family.

- Yellow flycatcher, Erythrocercus holochlorus

== Sylviid warblers, parrotbills, and allies ==
Order: Passeriformes Family: Sylviidae

The family Sylviidae is a group of small insectivorous passerine birds. They mainly occur as breeding species, as the common name implies, in Europe, Asia and, to a lesser extent, Africa. Most are of generally undistinguished appearance, but many have distinctive songs.

- Eurasian blackcap, Sylvia atricapilla
- Garden warbler, Sylvia borin (A)
- Barred warbler, Curruca nisoria
- Banded parisoma, Curruca boehmi
- Lesser whitethroat, Curruca curruca (A)
- Arabian warbler, Curruca leucomelaena
- Western Orphean warbler, Curruca hortensis
- Asian desert warbler, Curruca nana
- Menetries's warbler, Curruca mystacea
- Eastern subalpine warbler, Curruca cantillans
- Greater whitethroat, Curruca communis

== White-eyes, yuhinas, and allies ==
Order: Passeriformes Family: Zosteropidae

The white-eyes are small and mostly undistinguished, their plumage above being generally some dull colour like greenish-olive, but some species have a white or bright yellow throat, breast or lower parts, and several have buff flanks. As their name suggests, many species have a white ring around each eye.

- Pale white-eye, Zosterops flavilateralis
- Abyssinian white-eye, Zosterops abyssinicus
- Socotra white-eye, Zosterops socotranus
- Heuglin's white-eye, Zosterops poliogastrus

== Laughingthrushes and allies ==
Order: Passeriformes Family: Leiothrichidae

The laughingthrushes are somewhat diverse in size and colouration, but are characterised by soft fluffy plumage.

- Rufous chatterer, Argya rubiginosa
- Scaly chatterer, Argya aylmeri
- White-rumped babbler, Turdoides leucopygia
- Scaly babbler, Turdoides squamulata

== Oxpeckers ==
Order: Passeriformes Family: Buphagidae

As both the English and scientific names of these birds imply, they feed on ectoparasites, primarily ticks, found on large mammals.

- Red-billed oxpecker, Buphagus erythrorynchus

== Starlings ==
Order: Passeriformes Family: Sturnidae

Starlings are small to medium-sized passerine birds. Their flight is strong and direct and they are very gregarious. Their preferred habitat is fairly open country. They eat insects and fruit. Plumage is typically dark with a metallic sheen.

- European starling, Sturnus vulgaris (A)
- Wattled starling, Creatophora cinerea
- Violet-backed starling, Cinnyricinclus leucogaster
- Bristle-crowned starling, Onychognathus salva
- Somali starling, Onychognathus blythii
- Magpie starling, Speculipastor bicolor
- Black-bellied starling, Notopholia corrusca
- Shelley's starling, Lamprotornis shelleyi
- Rüppell's starling, Lamprotornis purpuropterus
- Golden-breasted starling, Lamprotornis regius
- Superb starling, Lamprotornis superbus
- White-crowned starling, Lamprotornis albicapillus
- Fischer's starling, Lamprotornis fischeri
- Greater blue-eared starling, Lamprotornis chalybaeus

== Thrushes and allies ==
Order: Passeriformes Family: Turdidae

The thrushes are a group of passerine birds that occur mainly in the Old World. They are plump, soft plumaged, small to medium-sized insectivores or sometimes omnivores, often feeding on the ground. Many have attractive songs.

- Red-tailed ant-thrush, Neocossyphus rufus
- Somali thrush, Turdus ludoviciae (E)
- African bare-eyed thrush, Turdus tephronotus

== Old World flycatchers ==
Order: Passeriformes Family: Muscicapidae

Old World flycatchers are a large group of small passerine birds native to the Old World. They are mainly small arboreal insectivores. The appearance of these birds is highly varied, but they mostly have weak songs and harsh calls.

- Spotted flycatcher, Muscicapa striata
- Gambaga flycatcher, Muscicapa gambagae
- African gray flycatcher, Bradornis microrhynchus
- Pale flycatcher, Agricola pallidus
- Ashy flycatcher, Fraseria caerulescens
- Southern black-flycatcher, Melaenornis pammelaina
- Bearded scrub-robin, Cercotrichas quadrivirgata
- Black scrub-robin, Cercotrichas podobe
- Rufous-tailed scrub-robin, Cercotrichas galactotes
- Red-backed scrub-robin, Cercotrichas leucophrys
- White-browed robin-chat, Cossypha heuglini
- Red-capped robin-chat, Cossypha natalensis
- Spotted morning-thrush, Cichladusa guttata
- White-throated robin, Irania gutturalis
- Thrush nightingale, Luscinia luscinia (A)
- Common nightingale, Luscinia megarhynchos
- Semicollared flycatcher, Ficedula semitorquata (A)
- Common redstart, Phoenicurus phoenicurus
- Black redstart, Phoenicurus ochruros
- Little rock-thrush, Monticola rufocinereus
- Rufous-tailed rock-thrush, Monticola saxatilis
- Blue rock-thrush, Monticola solitarius
- Whinchat, Saxicola rubetra
- European stonechat, Saxicola rubicola
- African stonechat, Saxicola torquatus
- Northern wheatear, Oenanthe oenanthe
- Capped wheatear, Oenanthe pileata (A)
- Red-breasted wheatear, Oenanthe bottae (A)
- Isabelline wheatear, Oenanthe isabellina
- Heuglin's wheatear, Oenanthe heuglini (A)
- Desert wheatear, Oenanthe deserti
- Eastern black-eared wheatear, Oenanthe melanoleuca (A)
- Pied wheatear, Oenanthe pleschanka
- Somali wheatear, Oenanthe phillipsi
- Blackstart, Oenanthe melanura
- Sombre rock chat, Oenanthe dubia
- Brown-tailed chat, Oenanthe scotocerca
- Abyssinian wheatear, Oenanthe lugubris
- Mourning wheatear, Oenanthe lugens
- Kurdish wheatear, Oenanthe xanthoprymna (A)

== Sunbirds and spiderhunters ==
Order: Passeriformes Family: Nectariniidae

The sunbirds and spiderhunters are very small passerine birds which feed largely on nectar, although they will also take insects, especially when feeding young. Flight is fast and direct on their short wings. Most species can take nectar by hovering like a hummingbird, but usually perch to feed.

- Eastern violet-backed sunbird, Anthreptes orientalis
- Collared sunbird, Hedydipna collaris
- Nile Valley sunbird, Hedydipna metallica
- Olive sunbird, Cyanomitra olivacea
- Mouse-coloured sunbird, Cyanomitra veroxii
- Amethyst sunbird, Chalcomitra amethystina
- Hunter's sunbird, Chalcomitra hunteri
- Mariqua sunbird, Cinnyris mariquensis
- Black-bellied sunbird, Cinnyris nectarinioides
- Purple-banded sunbird, Cinnyris bifasciatus
- Tsavo sunbird, Cinnyris tsavoensis
- Violet-breasted sunbird, Cinnyris chalcomelas
- Shining sunbird, Cinnyris habessinicus
- Variable sunbird, Cinnyris venustus dorii

== Weavers and allies ==
Order: Passeriformes Family: Ploceidae

The weavers are small passerine birds related to the finches. They are seed-eating birds with rounded conical bills. The males of many species are brightly coloured, usually in red or yellow and black, some species show variation in colour only in the breeding season.

- Red-billed buffalo-weaver, Bubalornis niger
- White-headed buffalo-weaver, Dinemellia dinemelli
- Speckle-fronted weaver, Sporopipes frontalis (A)
- White-browed sparrow-weaver, Plocepasser mahali
- Donaldson-Smith's sparrow-weaver, Plocepasser donaldsoni
- Gray-headed social-weaver, Pseudonigrita arnaudi
- Black-capped social-weaver, Pseudonigrita cabanisi
- Red-headed weaver, Anaplectes rubriceps
- Red weaver, Anaplectes jubaensis
- Black-necked weaver, Ploceus nigricollis
- African golden-weaver, Ploceus subaureus
- Golden palm weaver, Ploceus bojeri
- Lesser masked-weaver, Ploceus intermedius
- Vitelline masked-weaver, Ploceus vitellinus
- Rüppell's weaver, Ploceus galbula
- Speke's weaver, Ploceus spekei
- Village weaver, Ploceus cucullatus
- Salvadori's weaver, Ploceus dichrocephalus
- Chestnut weaver, Ploceus rubiginosus
- Forest weaver, Ploceus bicolor
- Red-billed quelea, Quelea quelea
- Northern red bishop, Euplectes franciscanus
- Fire-fronted bishop, Euplectes diadematus
- Fan-tailed widowbird, Euplectes axillaris
- Grosbeak weaver, Amblyospiza albifrons

== Waxbills and allies ==
Order: Passeriformes Family: Estrildidae

The estrildid finches are small passerine birds of the Old World tropics and Australasia. They are gregarious and often colonial seed eaters with short thick but pointed bills. They are all similar in structure and habits, but have wide variation in plumage colours and patterns.

- Gray-headed silverbill, Spermestes griseicapilla (A)
- Black-and-white mannikin, Spermestes bicolor
- African silverbill, Euodice cantans
- Black-cheeked waxbill, Brunhilda charmosyna
- Common waxbill, Estrilda astrild
- Crimson-rumped waxbill, Estrilda rhodopyga
- Quailfinch, Ortygospiza atricollis (A)
- Cut-throat, Amadina fasciata
- Purple grenadier, Uraeginthus ianthinogaster
- Red-cheeked cordonbleu, Uraeginthus bengalus
- Blue-capped cordonbleu, Uraeginthus cyanocephalus
- Green-winged pytilia, Pytilia melba
- Peters's twinspot, Hypargos niveoguttatus
- Red-billed firefinch, Lagonosticta senegala

== Indigobirds ==
Order: Passeriformes Family: Viduidae

The indigobirds are finch-like species which usually have black or indigo predominating in their plumage. All are brood parasites, which lay their eggs in the nests of estrildid finches.

- Pin-tailed whydah, Vidua macroura
- Eastern paradise-whydah, Vidua paradisaea
- Steel-blue whydah, Vidua hypocherina
- Straw-tailed whydah, Vidua fischeri
- Village indigobird, Vidua chalybeata

== Old World sparrows ==
Order: Passeriformes Family: Passeridae

Old World sparrows are small passerine birds. In general, sparrows tend to be small, plump, brown or grey birds with short tails and short powerful beaks. Sparrows are seed eaters, but they also consume small insects.

- House sparrow, Passer domesticus (I)
- Somali sparrow, Passer castanopterus
- Shelley's rufous sparrow, Passer shelleyi
- Swainson's sparrow, Passer swainsonii
- Parrot-billed sparrow, Passer gongonensis
- Arabian golden sparrow, Passer euchlorus
- Chestnut sparrow, Passer eminibey
- Yellow-spotted bush sparrow, Gymnoris pyrgita

== Wagtails and pipits ==
Order: Passeriformes Family: Motacillidae

Motacillidae is a family of small passerine birds with medium to long tails. They include the wagtails, longclaws and pipits. They are slender, ground feeding insectivores of open country.

- Gray wagtail, Motacilla cinerea
- Western yellow wagtail, Motacilla flava
- African pied wagtail, Motacilla aguimp
- White wagtail, Motacilla alba
- African pipit, Anthus cinnamomeus
- Long-billed pipit, Anthus similis
- Tawny pipit, Anthus campestris
- Plain-backed pipit, Anthus leucophrys
- Malindi pipit, Anthus melindae
- Tree pipit, Anthus trivialis
- Red-throated pipit, Anthus cervinus
- Golden pipit, Tmetothylacus tenellus
- Pangani longclaw, Macronyx aurantiigula

== Finches, euphonias, and allies ==
Order: Passeriformes Family: Fringillidae

Finches are seed-eating passerine birds, that are small to moderately large and have a strong beak, usually conical and in some species very large. All have twelve tail feathers and nine primaries. These birds have a bouncing flight with alternating bouts of flapping and gliding on closed wings, and most sing well.

- Somali golden-winged grosbeak, Rhynchostruthus louisae (E)
- Reichenow's seedeater, Crithagra reichenowi
- White-bellied canary, Crithagra dorsostriatus
- Northern grosbeak-canary, Crithagra donaldsoni
- Brown-rumped seedeater, Crithagra tristriatus
- Warsangli linnet, Linaria johannis (E)

== Old World buntings ==
Order: Passeriformes Family: Emberizidae

The emberizids are a large family of passerine birds. They are seed-eating birds with distinctively shaped bills. Many emberizid species have distinctive head patterns.

- Ortolan bunting, Emberiza hortulana
- Somali bunting, Emberiza poliopleura
- Cinnamon-breasted bunting, Emberiza tahapisi
- Striolated bunting, Emberiza striolata

== See also ==
- List of birds
- Lists of birds by region
