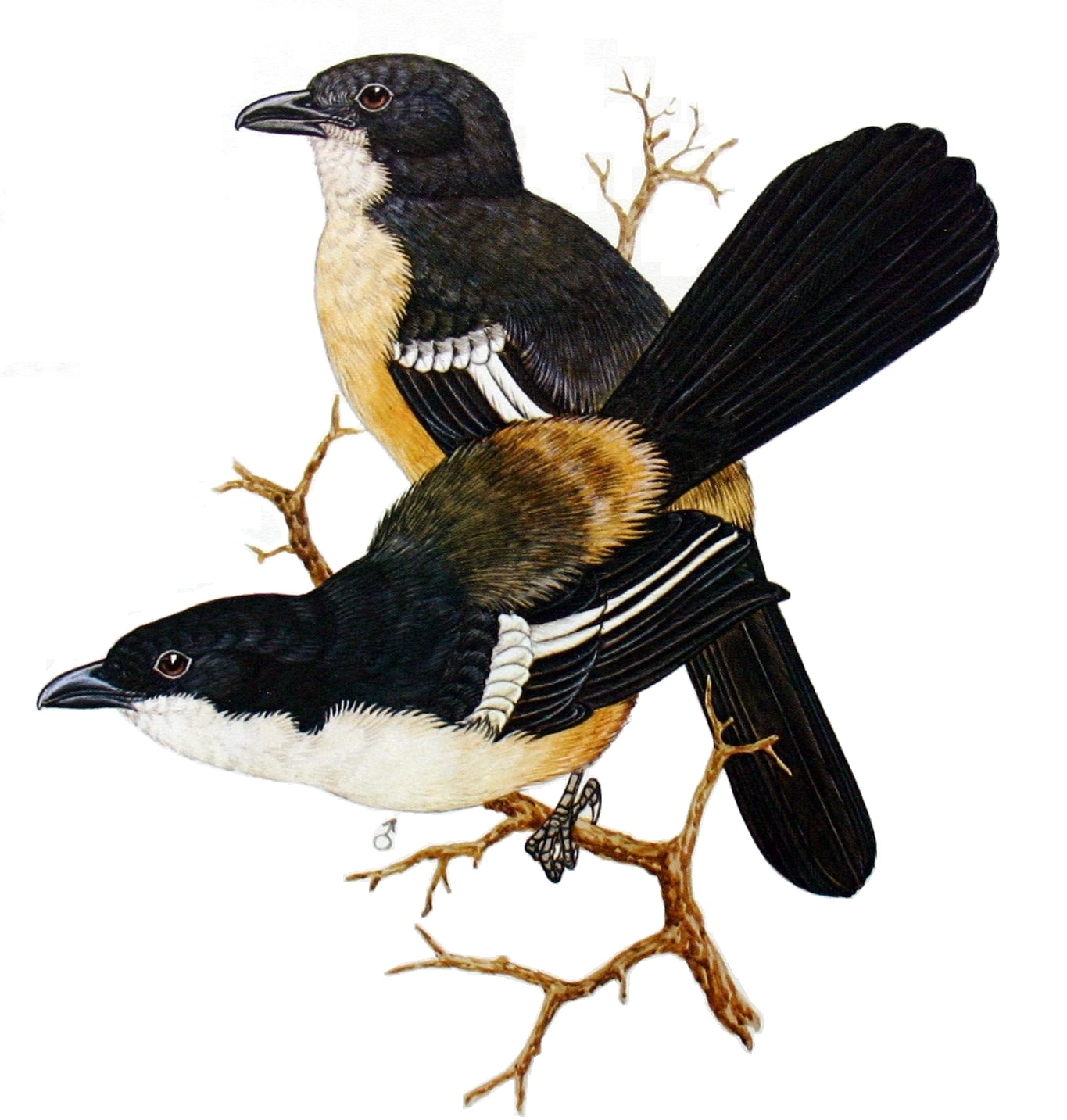

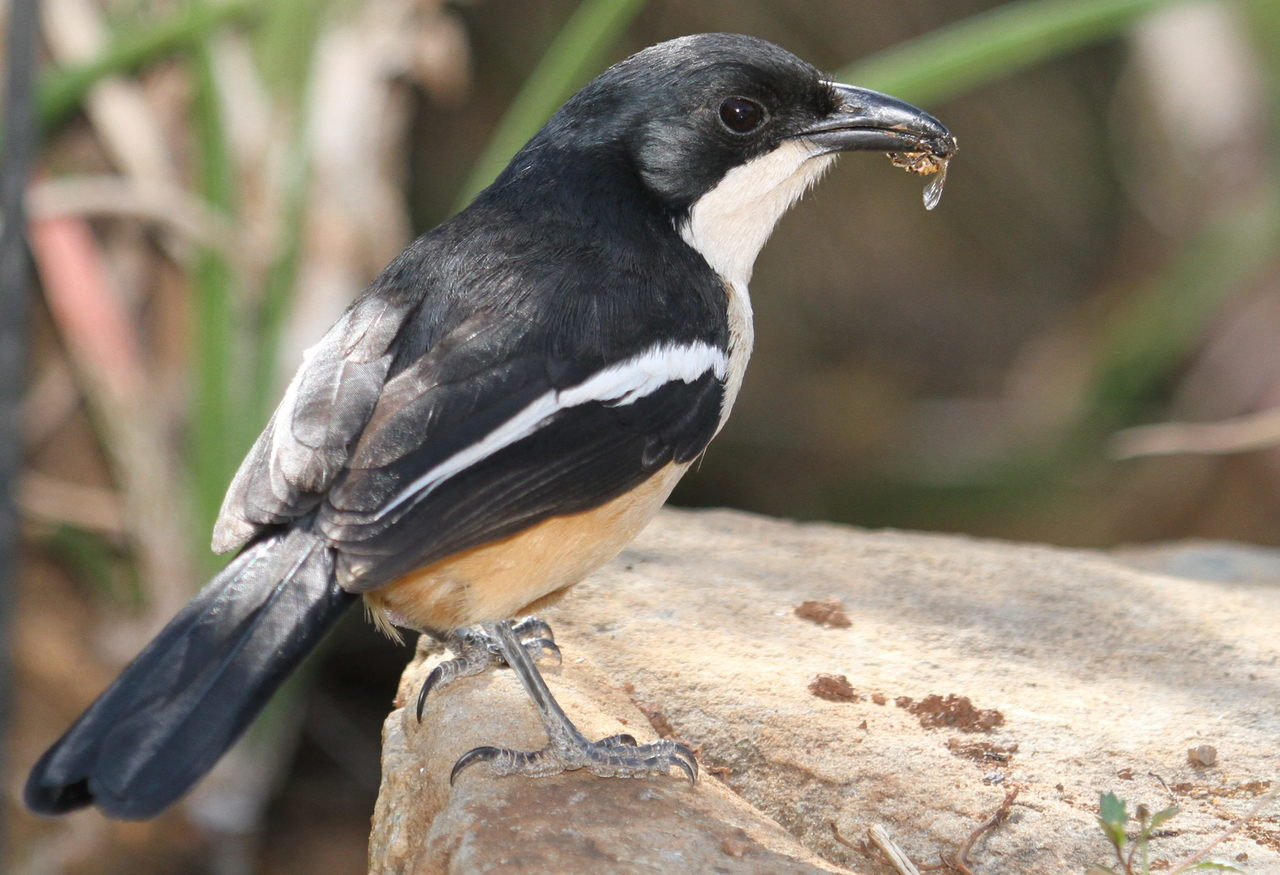

Conservation status
- Least Concern (IUCN 3.1)

Scientific classification
- Kingdom: Animalia
- Phylum: Chordata
- Class: Aves
- Order: Passeriformes
- Family: Malaconotidae
- Genus: Laniarius
- Species: L. ferrugineus

Binomial name
- Laniarius ferrugineus (Gmelin, JF, 1788)

= Southern boubou =

Species of bird

Call of L. f. pondoensis

The southern boubou (Laniarius ferrugineus) ('ferrugineus' - rust-coloured) is a species of bushshrike. Though these passerine birds and their relations were once included with true shrikes in the Laniidae, they are not closely related to that family.

This species is found in southeastern Africa, mainly in southeastern Zimbabwe, eastern Botswana, Mozambique and southern and eastern South Africa. It frequents dense thickets in forests, mangroves, scrub and gardens. In drier regions, it is found in riverside woodland.

== Taxonomy ==
The southern boubou was formally described in 1788 by the German naturalist Johann Friedrich Gmelin in his revised and expanded edition of Carl Linnaeus's Systema Naturae. He placed it with the shrikes in the genus Lanius and coined the binomial name Lanius ferrugineus. The specific epithet is Latin meaning "rusty-coloured". Gmelin based his description on the "ferruginous bellied shrike" that had been described in 1781 by the English ornithologist John Latham in his book A General Synopsis of Birds. Latham had examined a specimen from South Africa that formed part of the collection of a Mrs Blomefield. The southern boubou is now one of 22 species placed in the genus Laniarius that was introduced in 1816 by the French ornithologist Louis Pierre Vieillot. A molecular phylogenetic study published in 2008 found that the southern boubou was sister to the East Coast boubou (Laniarius sublacteus).

Six subspecies are recognised:

- L. f. transvaalensis Roberts, 1922 – southeast Botswana, north South Africa and Eswatini (formerly Swaziland)
- L. f. tongensis Roberts, 1931 – south Mozambique and east South Africa
- L. f. natalensis Roberts, 1922 – west, south KwaZulu-Natal to southwest Eastern Cape Province (east, southeast South Africa)
- L. f. pondoensis Roberts, 1922 – northeast Eastern Cape Province (southeast South Africa)
- L. f. savensis da Rosa Pinto, 1963 – southeast Zimbabwe and south Mozambique
- L. f. ferrugineus (Gmelin, JF, 1788) – south Western Cape Province (south South Africa)

== Description ==
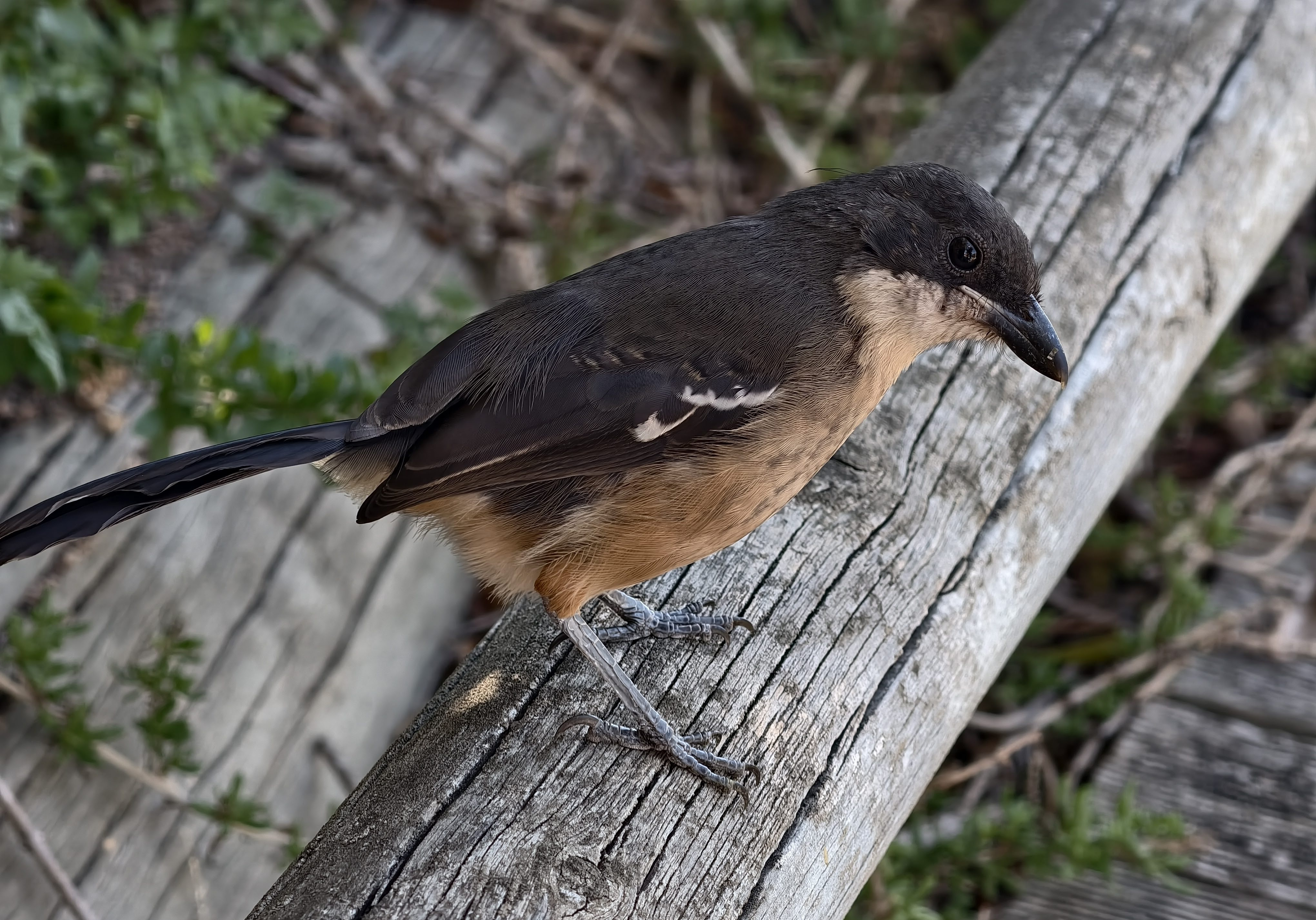
Southern boubou (Laniarius ferrugineus) – female. Simon's Town, South Africa

The male southern boubou is a fairly distinctive 20–22 cm long bird with black upperparts extending from the top of the head down to the tail, a striking white wing stripe, and a relatively long black tail with white outer feathers. The underparts are white shading to rufous on the lower belly, undertail and flanks. The bill, eyes and legs are black.

The female is similar to the male, but dark grey above and with a rufous wash to the breast. Young birds are like the female, but mottled buff-brown above, have a buff wash to the wing bar, and are barred below.

The rufous on the underparts, which gives this species its scientific name, distinguishes it from the tropical and swamp boubous. It superficially resembles the southern fiscal, Lanius collaris, but is shorter tailed, has more white in the wing, and is much less conspicuous in its habits.

== Behaviour ==
Unlike the true shrikes, which perch conspicuously in the open, the southern boubou prefers to forage in dense vegetation close to the ground, a habit which has led to its being called shy and skulking. The food is mainly insects, taken from the ground or picked off vegetation as the bird creeps low in bushes. It will also take small rodents, lizards snails and fruits.

The southern boubou has a duetted call, with a ooo-whee-ooo, followed by a whistled ooo-ooo-wheee or wheee-wheee followed by ooo-whee-ooo. The duet has many variations and the liquid ooo-whee-ooo call may be mistaken for that of a black-headed oriole. Its alarm call is a muted cluck.

== Breeding ==
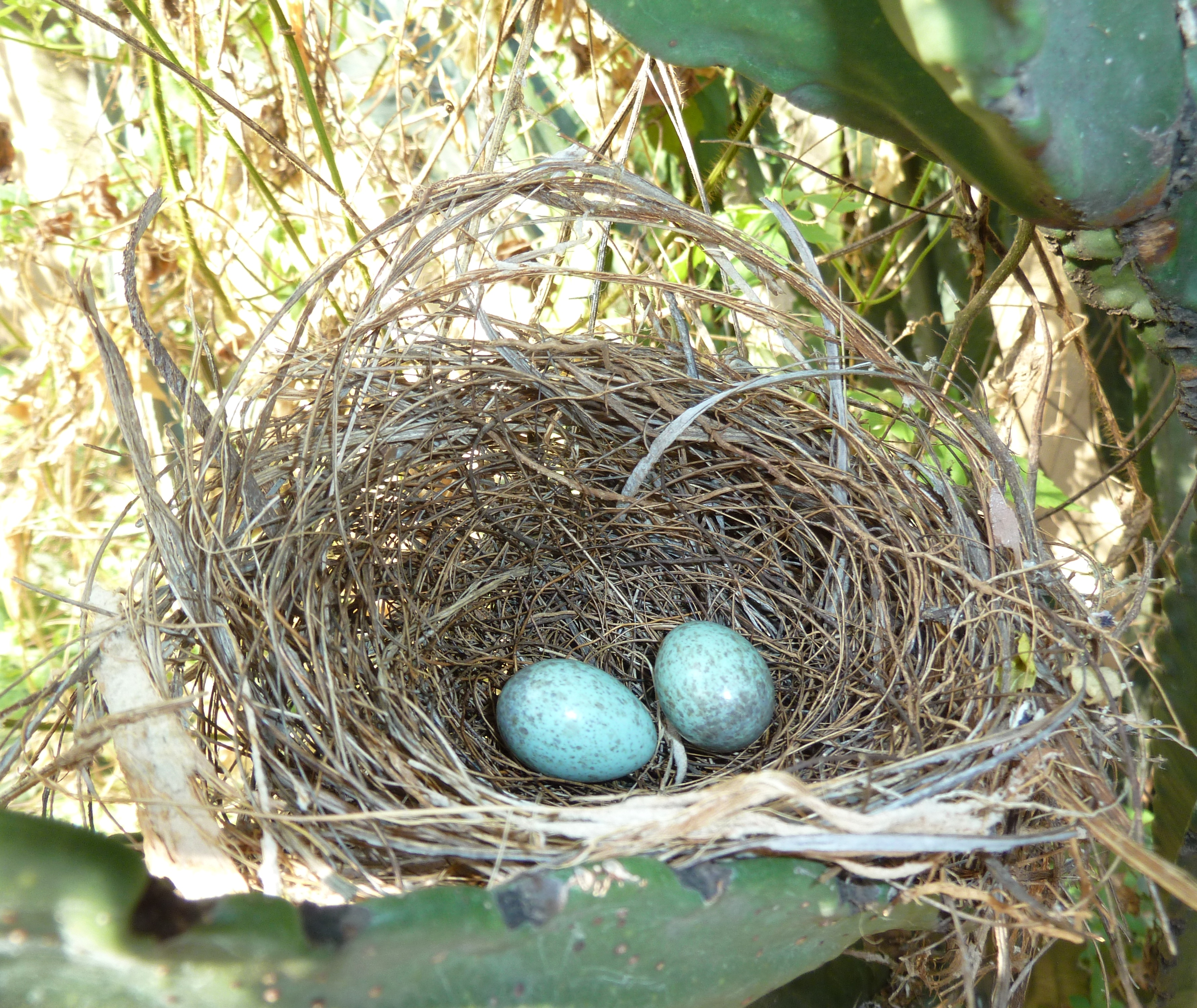
Nest in a Euphorbia tree

The nest, built mainly by the female, is a shallow cup in a creeper or dense bush into which the usually two brown-blotched greenish-white eggs are laid. Both sexes incubate for 16–17 days to hatching, and both bring food to the chicks. Fledging takes place in about another 16 days. About 2% of nests are parasitised by the black cuckoo.
