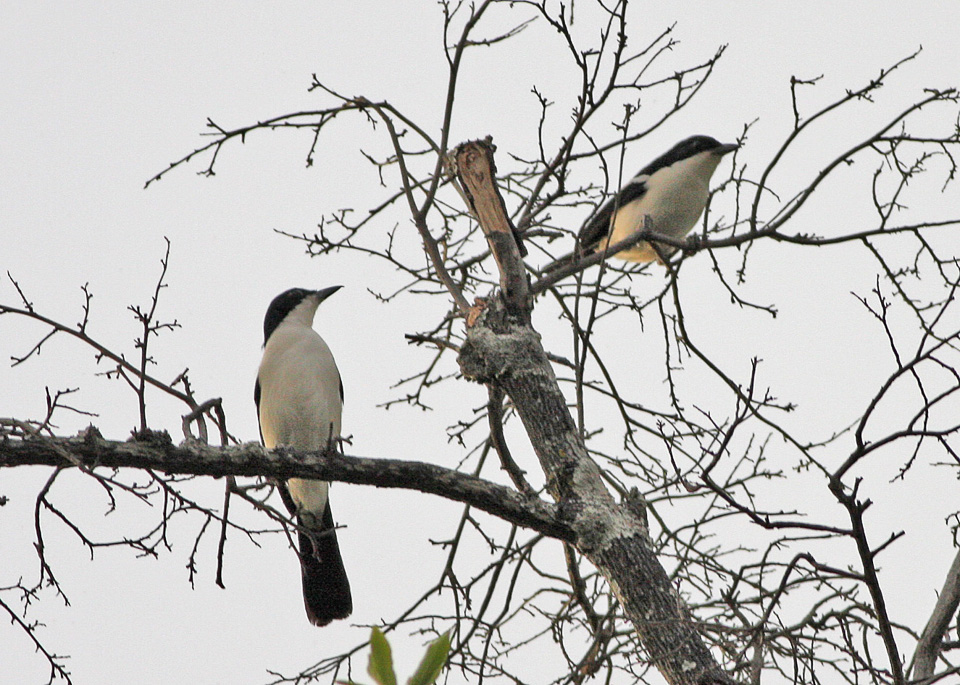
- A pair in Botswana

Conservation status
- Least Concern (IUCN 3.1)

Scientific classification
- Kingdom: Animalia
- Phylum: Chordata
- Class: Aves
- Order: Passeriformes
- Family: Malaconotidae
- Genus: Laniarius
- Species: L. bicolor

Binomial name
- Laniarius bicolor (Hartlaub, 1857)

Synonyms
- Laniarius bicolor (J.Verreaux, 1857)

= Swamp boubou =

Species of bird

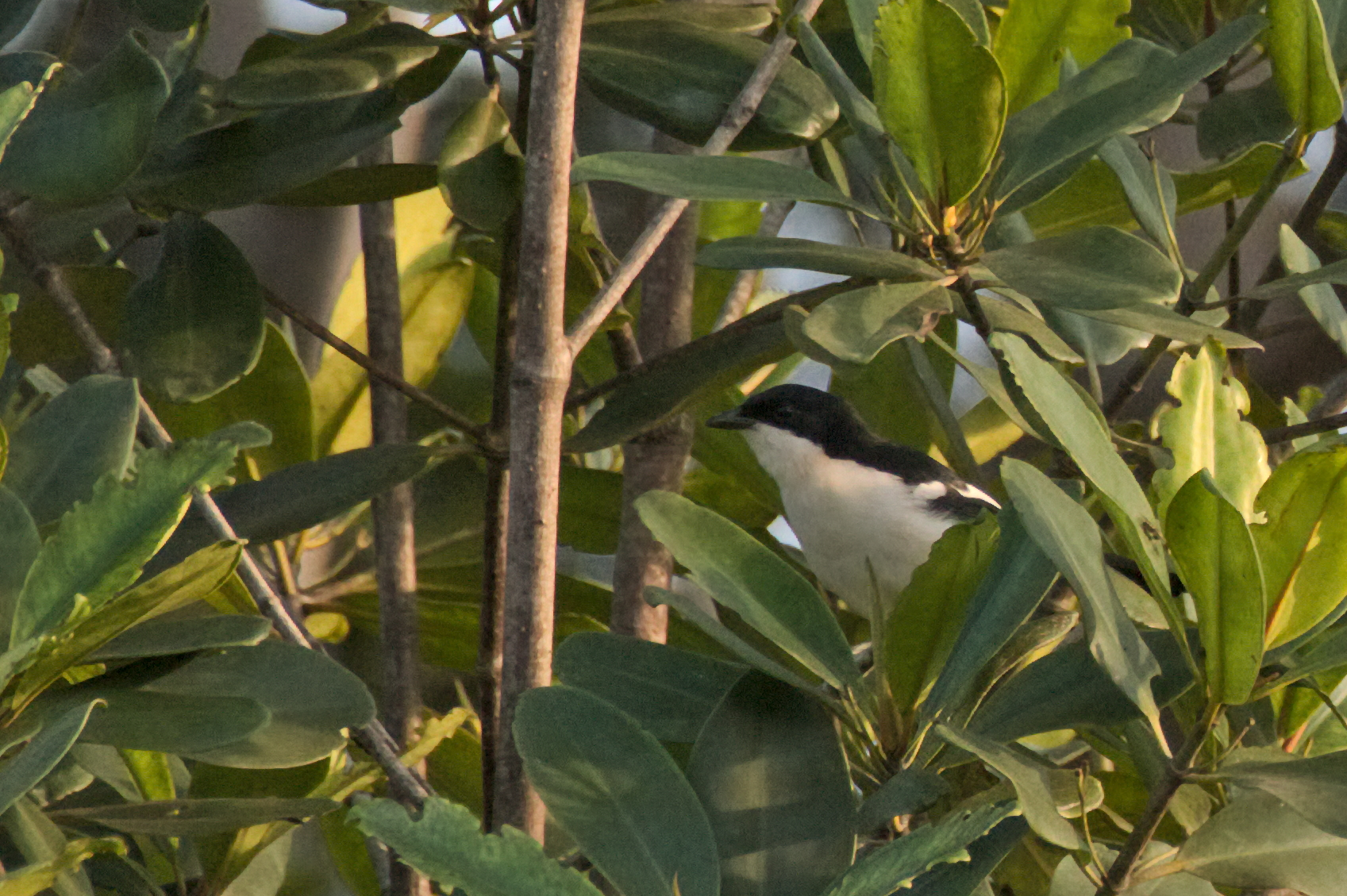
Perched in riparian vegetation, coastal Angola

The swamp boubou (Laniarius bicolor), also known as the Gabon boubou, is a species of bird in the Malaconotidae or bushshrike family. It is native to western and southern Central Africa. In the north of their range, savannah thickets constitute an important part of their habitat, while in the south they are strongly associated with river systems and marshes, for which they are named. The pair bond appears to be maintained by duetting, which in the south is generally synchronous or overlapping. It is most similar to L. major major, with which it perhaps hybridizes, but the underpart plumage is immaculate white, while the female contributes a ratchet-like note to the duet.

== Range and habitat ==
It is found in Angola, Botswana, Cameroon, Republic of the Congo, DRC, Gabon, Namibia, Zambia, and Zimbabwe. Its natural habitats are regenerating forest, moist to seasonally dry savannah thicket, coastal scrubland and mangroves, and ravine forests of the Angolan escarpment. In the south of its range it is confined to floodplain systems. Along these rivers and swamps they frequent dense, tangled riparian vegetation, edges of reedbeds, papyrus stands or clumps of water fig on islands.

== Description and identification ==
The sexes are similar in appearance. They are large passerines that measure 23 to 25 cm in length. The upperparts are deep blue-black with a slight luster. The long, fluffy rump feathers have concealed white spots, giving the rump a pale appearance. The wings are black with white wing-stripes, and the underparts are pure white. The iris is dark brown, the bill and palate are black, and the legs and feet slate-blue. Juvenile birds have light dusky barring on the underside, and buffy-tipped and barred upperpart plumage. Immatures are duller than adults with buff-tipped wing-coverts and browner bills.

Their larger size, more slender bill, immaculate white underparts, and vocals distinguish them from the tropical boubou where they locally occur together. In those locations the southern race behaves as good species, but somewhat less so with the northern races which are sometimes merged with L. major.

== Habits ==
They are monogamous and year-round territorial birds. They forage from ground level to the upper canopy, often working their way up before gliding down to adjacent vegetation. They also hawk insects, or flick ground debris like a thrush. Their food consists of arthropods, insects and worms, and on occasion small fruit. Pairs perform a duet which is initiated by a soft guttural sound, by either sex. The male then gives a short whistle, to which the female immediately replies with a harsh, ratchet-like kick-ick. Harsh clicking sounds are also given at dusk when approaching their roost. Vocals may be augmented by wing fripping in excited birds. Rump feathers are fluffed out during territorial threat or flight-song courtship displays.

== Nesting ==
Nesting sites are widely spaced. Breeding occurs at any time of the year, though in the south, mainly in spring. The nest is a shallow cup of loosely woven twigs, placed some 2 to 3 meters above ground in a tangle, or in an ornamental bougainvillea shrub. Two eggs are laid, measuring 23 x 20 mm. They are pale cream or greenish in colour, and lightly speckled with rufous. Parasitism by the black cuckoo has been recorded. Moult occurs upon completion of the breeding period.

== Races ==
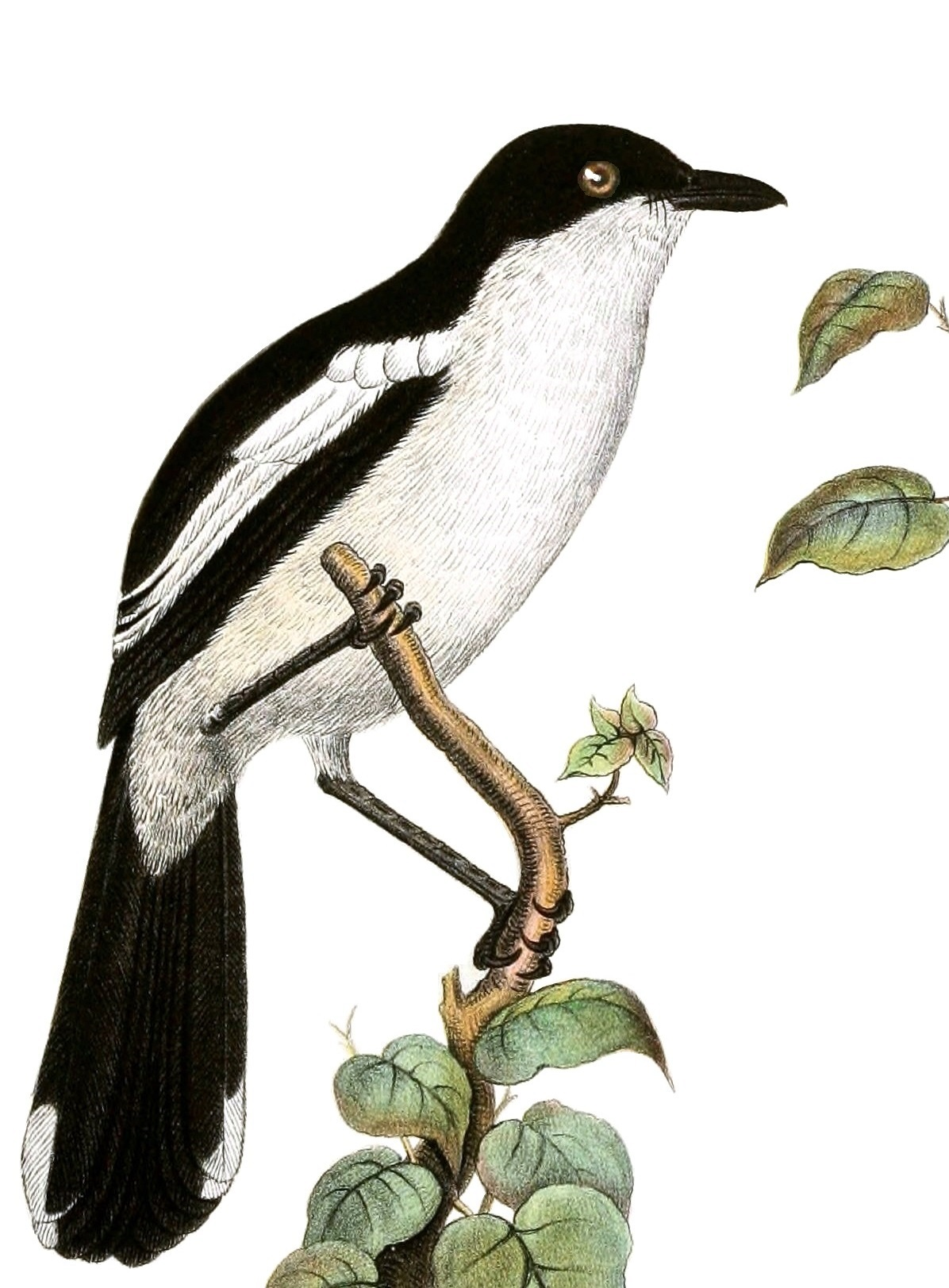
Laniarius bicolor sticturus illustrated by Otto Finsch, showing the three white-edged secondaries, and the white-tipped rectrices of this race

There are three accepted races:

- L. b. bicolor (Hartlaub, 1857), the "Gabon boubou"

Range: coastal Cameroon to Cabinda, Angola
Description: smallest and darkest race, sometimes with all-black secondaries

- L. b. guttatus (Hartlaub, 1865)

Range: Republic of the Congo to Lubango, Angola

- L. b. sticturus Hartlaub & Finsch, 1870, the "Okavango boubou"

Range: Kunene river, Kavango river and delta, and upper Zambezi catchment
Description: largest race with most white in the wing, and sometimes white-tipped rectrices
