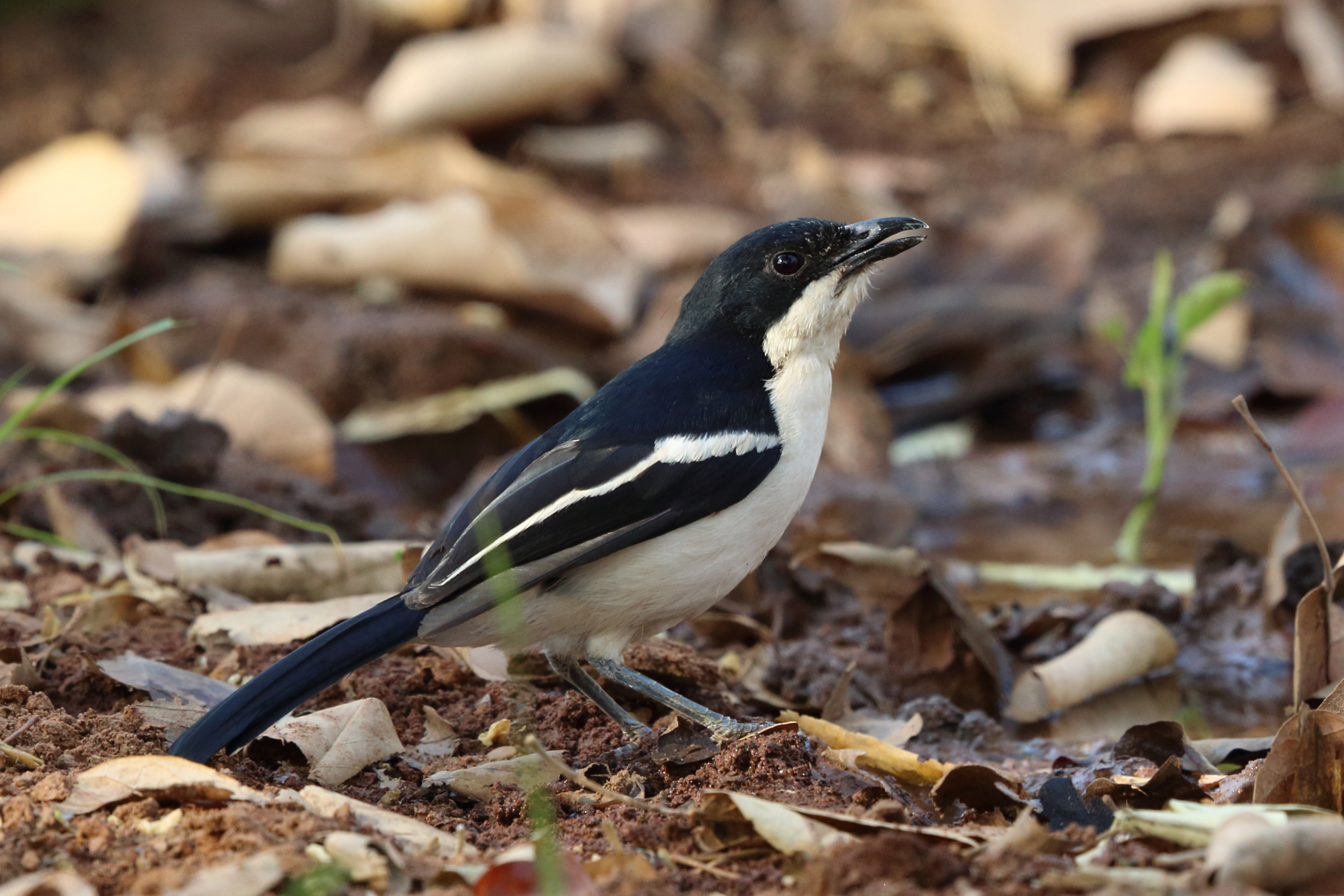

Conservation status
- Least Concern (IUCN 3.1)

Scientific classification
- Kingdom: Animalia
- Phylum: Chordata
- Class: Aves
- Order: Passeriformes
- Family: Malaconotidae
- Genus: Laniarius
- Species: L. aethiopicus

Binomial name
- Laniarius aethiopicus (Hartlaub, 1848)

Synonyms
- Laniarius ferrugineus major

= Tropical boubou =

Species of bird

The tropical boubou or bell shrike (Laniarius aethiopicus) is a medium-sized passerine bird of sub-Saharan Africa. This very diverse "species" with its numerous subspecies and morphs has since long posed a taxonomic problem, and recent research suggests it is a cryptic species complex that has now been split into several species.

== Description ==
The tropical boubou is fairly large for its family (bushshrikes), measuring 23–25 cm in length. Its weight can vary between about 38-70 g, but typically adults weigh between 50 and 60 g. Females are on average a bit smaller than males, but individual variation is so large that for most practical purposes the sexes seem to be of identical size. The wing measures about 98 mm on average (between 85 and 110), the tail is a mere two millimetres longer both on average and as regards variation. The tarsus is 29–37 mm long, 33 mm on average, while the bill's exposed culmen measures a little over 20 mm in some populations and as much as 25 mm in others. Unlike the other measurements where there is mostly individual variation, the bill length might distinctly vary between subspecies.

Not only are males and females the same size, they have identical plumage too. The adults' upper parts and tail are glossy blue-black except for concealed white spots on the rump, visible only when the wings are spread and the rump feathers are erected. The underparts are white, in some populations with a buffy or pinkish tinge on the breast and flanks, which is not always noticeable except in good light. The wings of most subspecies have a white stripe on the wing coverts, in some extending onto the secondary remiges. The tips of the outer tail feathers can be white in some subspecies. The bill is black, the legs and feet bluish grey. The irides are dark reddish brown.

Nestlings have pinkish-brown skin and are nude after hatching, later growing sparse down; they apparently have spots inside their bills which they show their parents to get fed. Fledglings are similar to adults but duller, with the brownish head and the upper parts appearing mottled due to yellowish-ochre to tawny feather tips, forming a barring on the lower back and rump. The wing-stripe, if present, is dulled down. The undertail coverts are buff, and there is usually dusky barring on the dull white underside, especially on the flanks. The bill is greyish brown above, paler below. Immature birds independent from their parents have lost most of the mottling (except on the wing coverts) and barring, but their wing stripe and underside are still dull white, shading to brown on the flanks; any white tail feather tips appear at this stage.

The northwesternmost populations of major might be confused with Turati's boubou (L. turatii), which has no white wing-band and a buff chin and white belly, while major around the southern edge of the Congo Basin look almost identical to the swamp boubou (L. bicolor), but this is pure white below and its females give a characteristic "ratchet" call in duets. Southeastern birds (mossambicus and especially limpopoensis) resemble the southern boubou (L. ferrugineus) but are black above instead of dark brown and grey – though this may be hard to see at a distance and entirely indistinguishable in the occasionally seen hybrid. When the tropical boubou is sympatric with other Laniarius, they are rarely found in the same habitat.

=== Voice ===
This species is heard more often than seen, but its calls often help to locate it visually. To vocalize they move higher off the ground than during their usual activities, and may perch on an exposed site. They also nod their head and bow their body when calling, making them even conspicuous sometimes. Calls like bou, hou or boubou give the bird its name; they may be extended into a bubbling bobobobo and are given loudly and higher-pitched to announce the birds' presence, or lower and softer by foraging groups to maintain contact. Like many bush-shrikes, it has a wide vocal repertoire that includes duets in which two individuals – a male-female pair or two males with adjacent territories – give notes alternately in so rapid a sequence that they sound like one bird. As the voicebox of birds is a syrinx not a larynx, in particular many Passeri can sing in two voices at the same time; tropical boubous that have lost their mate can make the same sequence that a pair would make. Males probably start most duets, and their notes are mostly low-pitched whistles and/or harsh croaks; females' notes are typically higher whistles and/or "harsh tearing or rattling sounds". But although the birds' vocalizations are somewhat harsh, they are still able of a wide range of frequencies and males provide the higher voice in certain duets.

Duets usually consist of one exchange, two or three calls in total. But up to seven exchanges have been recorded. A duet may be repeated up to 75 times, and in experiments where the birds were confronted with taped vocalizations, they could be enticed to up to 200 duets. A dozen or more duet types exist, and some seem to confer specific information, forming a Morse code-like sort of language. Examples of typical duet sequences include hoooooo-ho-ho, hoho-u-ho, hoo-hii-hoo, haw-Weeer-haw, hoou-Weer-hoou, houhou-Weeer and bobobobo-Weeer. During territorial contests of subspecies major, a wide range of duet types is sung, in particular 1–3 and 9–11. Playback of duet types 1, 2, 9 and perhaps 6 elicits duets of the same type, as well as of others; types 2 and 6 are typically also answered with types 9 and 11, and type 9 with type 3 and perhaps 11.

Duet type 5 of major consists of one to several dozen (typically about 3) short call notes given simultaneously by territorial pairs. Its loud male calls are at about 1.4 kHz, 0.4 seconds and downslurred, while the female calls increase in frequency between 900–1,000 hertz, are less than half as long, and begin about halfway through the males' calls. After a pair has prevailed in a song contest with an intruder, the birds quieten down for some time and ascertain that the contestant has called it quits; then, they usually move to a prominent perch, the male at the very top with his mate below, and sing duet type 5. This vocalization might be considered a sort of "victory chant", conferring information about the events to neighboring pairs.

Northern birds typically give resonant hooo or hoou whistles, variously short or drawn-out. Among southern birds, grating Weeer and krzzzz calls, snoring Haaw croaks and rattling Ke-Ke-Ke are more common. Other harsh calls, like a metallic Tschanananana or SCHRANG! SCHRANG! are given by the male in aggression and courtship; eastern birds may also give call lit-tuu-iii at the end of a courtship display. Alarm calls are a variety of chattering outbursts; before roosting, birds often make a series of Tuk calls, and they also give a call when the parents change to brood the eggs or young. During social interactions, the wings are often forcefully shaken, producing a ripping mechanical sound.

This species may duet with the slate-colored boubou (L. funebris). Trios are common, especially young birds learning to sing tend to join in when a pair duets. Nestlings that want to be fed give high repeated chirps, as usual among passerines.

== Taxonomy and systematics ==
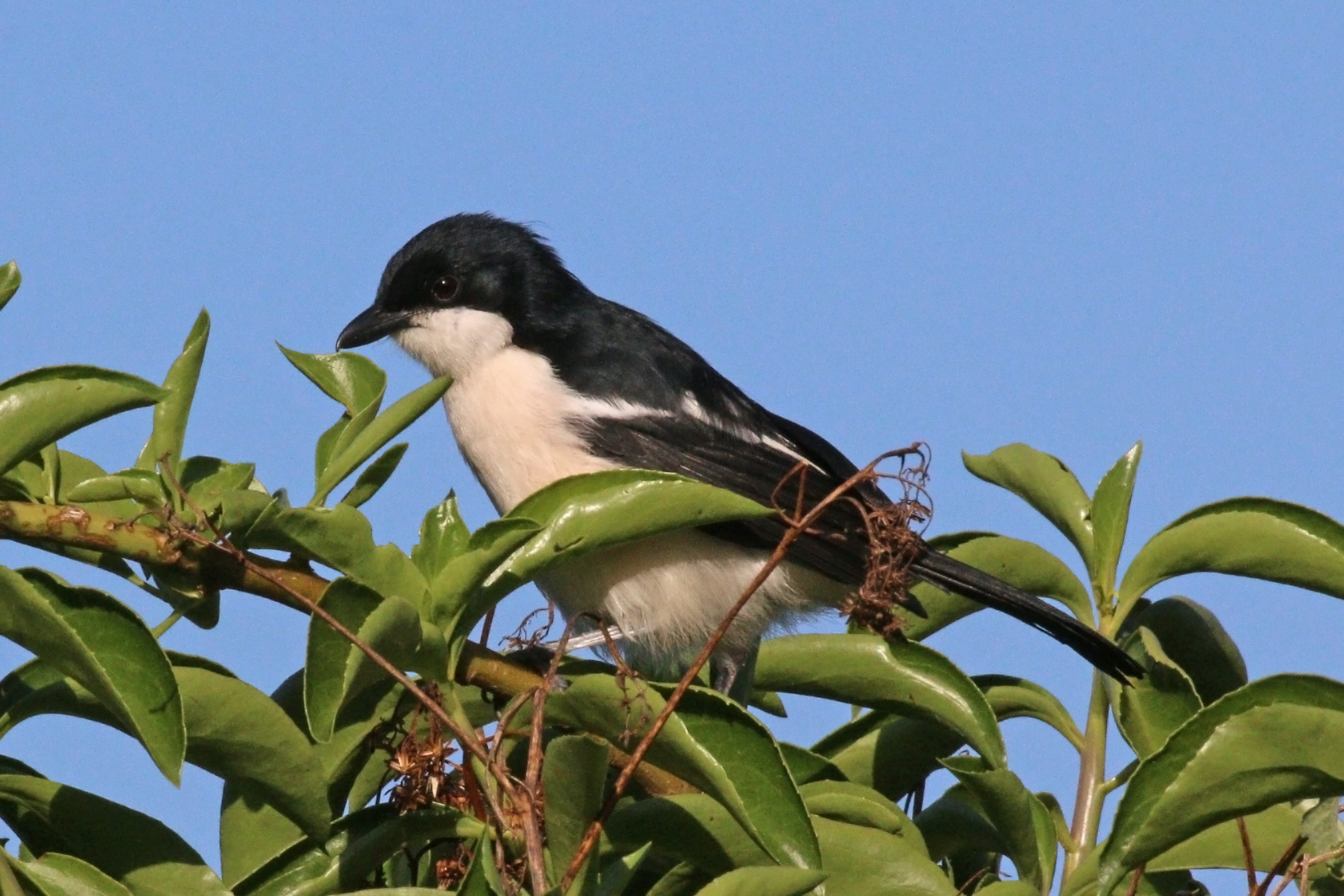
L. m. ambiguus Soysambu Conservancy, Kenya

Traditionally, seven subspecies of the tropical boubou were recognized – that is, if L. aethiopicus was considered a distinct species at all. As late as the mid-20th century for example, some authors included the entire tropical boubou complex within L. ferrugineus, which nowadays refers to the southern boubou only.

Recent cladistic analysis of nDNA BRM15 intron-15 and mtDNA NADH dehydrogenase subunit 2 and ATP synthase F0 subunit 6 sequence data indicates that the tropical boubou was traditionally recognized is a polyphyletic cryptic species complex, and that three additional species have been recognized, the Ethiopian boubou, the black boubou, and the East Coast boubou.

Contrary to what one might expect in a purely phenetic analysis, the conspicuous variation of wing stripes is no good indicator of relationships among these and related boubous. Vocalizations and habitat preferences, on the other hand, allow a good delimitation of the clades conventionally grouped as tropical boubou. The four proposed species are:

- Black boubou, L. nigerrimus – S Somalia. Includes L. liberatus

Outer tail feathers never have white tips. Short wings stripe across the median coverts. Breast and belly pinkish. The liberatus morph has long white wing stripe like aethiopicus, and a yellowish-buff chin to chest and supercilium.

A quite ancient lineage, part of a rather basal group of mostly allopatric relict forms – the dark-bellied mountain sooty boubou (L. poensis), Fuelleborn's boubou (L. fuelleborni) and perhaps slate-colored boubou (L. funebris), and the sympatric light-bellied red-naped boubou (L. ruficeps) to which it might be closest. The western members of this group inhabit montane forest, the others dry shrubland. The liberatus morph may be an atavism of plesiomorphic alleles retained from a common ancestor with L. ruficeps, as the type specimen showed no indication of recent hybridization whatsoever.

Many taxonomists now consider it to be a distinct species

- East Coast boubou or dimorphic boubou, L. sublacteus – Coastal Kenya, Zanzibar

Vestigial or no white wing stripe. Outer tail feathers may have white tips. Juveniles have no barring on underside. An all-black morph occurs in the area around the lower Jubba and Tana Rivers and on the Lamu Archipelago.

- Ethiopian boubou, L. aethiopicus – E Sudan through Djibouti, Eritrea, Ethiopia and W Somalia to N Kenya

Breast and belly pinkish. Narrow wing stripe, extending across the median and larger wing coverts, and often a bit onto the secondary remiges. Outer tail feathers never have white tips.

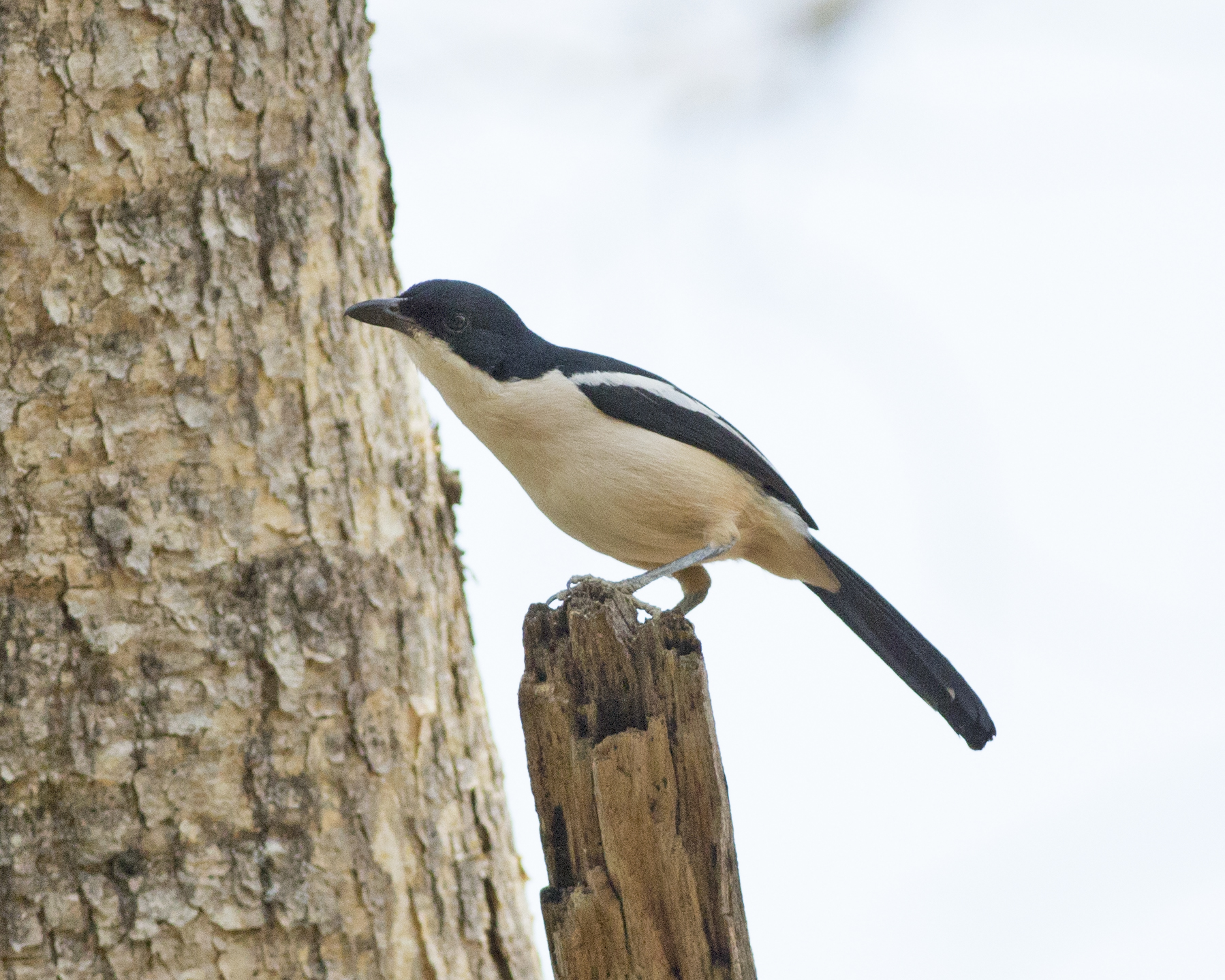
Laniarius m. mossambicus in Malawi

Current subspecies of the tropical boubou now include:

- West African boubou (tropical boubou in the strict sense), L. major – Sierra Leone east to Sudan, then south to the Great Lakes region, from there excluding the inner Congo Basin southwest to the Scarp of Angola. Intergrades with mossambicus in the southeastern Congo Basin. Possibly hybridizes with swamp boubou (L. bicolor) in the Angola region.
  - L. m. ambiguus – highlands of Kenya and NE Tanzania

In major, long narrow wing stripe across the median and larger wing coverts, and usually continuing onto the secondary remiges; breast and belly may be pinkish (particularly in northern birds) or off-white (as in most southern birds). In ambiguus, short wings stripe across the median coverts; breast and belly pinkish. Outer tail feathers may have white tips in both subspecies.

- L. "m." mossambicus – S DRCongo, S Tanzania, E Zambia, Malawi, E Mozambique, N Zimbabwe. Intergrades with major in the southeastern Congo Basin.

Smaller and buffier below than the northern populations. Long narrow wing stripe like in major. Outer tail feathers never have white tips.

- L. "m." limpopoensis – W Mozambique to S Zimbabwe and N South Africa. Hybridizes with southern boubou (L. ferrugineus) in Limpopo valley.

The buffiest of all, without pink tones. Long narrow wing stripe like in major. Outer tail feathers never have white tips.

These seem to be part of a close-knit and more apomorphic clade of parapatric to sympatric black-and-white (or -buff/-pinkish) boubous which mostly inhabit semihumid lowland habitat. Their relatives are Turati's boubou (L. turatii) and perhaps Luehder's bushshrike (L. luehderi), and the southern and swamp boubous. L. sublacteus seems to form a distinct southern lineage with the last two, but the southernmost tropical boubous are too little studied. It seems certain that they belong to the second group, where they may be a southward extension of L. aethiopicus, but more likely represent the southwestern populations of L. major. The hybridization is liable to confound DNA sequence analyses, particularly of mtDNA.

== Range and ecology ==
The tropical boubou occurs from about 10° northern latitude south to the Limpopo River in South Africa. In the western part of its range, it is found as a regular breeder from Côte d'Ivoire eastwards to about 5° N; it is not found further south along the Atlantic coast and in the inner Congo Basin, but occurs on the Scarp of Angola. It also does not seem to occur in northern Somalia, eastern Ethiopia and Kenya, and central Tanzania as well as the lower Ruvuma River basin. It is not a migratory bird and only moves around locally. Seasonal movements are known from Kenya. Vagrants have been recorded from Senegal, and records from The Gambia and Liberia probably are also mostly or all stray birds; a supposed vagrant from Bioko is not anymore believed to have been of this species.

It is not found in decidedly arid regions and dense forests such as the equatorial rain forest, but occurs on mountains up to 3,000 m ASL. It requires dense ground cover, and is found in a variety of forest and forest-edge habitats, including savannah, Miombo woodland and village gardens. In the drier parts of its range, it is generally restricted to riparian forest, though the black boubou also utilizes semiarid shrubland. Typical vegetation in its habitat is characterized by such plants as African juniper (Juniperus procera), bracken (Pteridium), Rosoideae shrubs or Brachystegia.

The birds defend a breeding territory of 1–3 hectares; outside the breeding season they move about in a larger area (up to 8 hectares) and are more tolerant of conspecifics, sometimes assembling into loose noisy groups. They rarely fly long distances and tend to skulk in the shrubs and low in trees like a coucal (Centropus), or move on the ground interrupted by bouts of watching where they stand alert, with the tail slightly raised. When alarmed, they will make a slow descending flight, flashing their white rump patches and giving warning calls, before taking cover. As usual for passerine birds, they scratch indirectly (foot-over-wing). Allopreening has been recorded between mates. At least southern birds moult their whole plumage after the breeding season. This species is presumably preyed upon by the usual vertebrate predators of mid-sized birds. A ringed individual nine to ten years old was recorded.

The tropical boubou may be common locally, with 100 individuals per square kilometer; in other places only one-third this population density is recorded however. Still, it is not an uncommon bird across its breeding range and the IUCN treats it as a species of least concern. When the species is split up, the black boubou and dimorphic boubou, which are found only in a limited area, might warrant uplisting.

=== Food and feeding ===
It usually forages on or near the ground, and does not ascend to the tree canopy often. It holds large prey down with its foot while eating. Like other bushshrikes (and true shrikes, Laniidae), the tropical boubou impales prey on thorns to eat later; it also wedges prey into crevices.

The food includes many kinds of large terrestrial invertebrates and their larvae as well as small terrestrial vertebrates, e.g. amphibians, beetles, geckos, lizards, Lepidoptera (moths and butterflies), mantises, Orthoptera (crickets, grasshoppers and locusts), rodents, snakes and termites. It often plunders other birds' nests and occasionally eats snails and fruit.

=== Reproduction ===
This species is monogamous. The tropical boubou, like many tropical birds, does not have a pronounced breeding season. Around the Equator, birds may breed at any time in the year. Further north and south, there is a peak breeding season in late spring and early summer at the start of the wet season, and little to no breeding takes place during late autumn and early winter at the start of the dry season. Courtship starts with the male chasing the female, the two hopping together through branches, and the male bobbing its head, bowing and giving a croaking call or low whistle. It makes gliding or descending display flights with the white rump spots exposed and producing mechanical noises with its remiges. The courtship climaxes with the male – wings drooped, tail fanned and rump feathers puffed up – giving repeated metallic or whistling calls. The couples may duet, but courtship feeding has not been observed.

The flimsy cup nest is built by both parents, but the female does more of the work. It consists of twigs, tendrils, small roots and the occasional grass leaf or bark piece, held together with spider web and sometimes lined with finer fibres; the walls are thick – more than one to more than 5 cm – but loosely constructed and the eggs can often be seen from the outside. The nest measures 10 to 20 cm in diameter, with a shallow nest cup around 8 cm in diameter and 2–5 cm deep. It is placed at varying heights, from a few dozen cm above ground in a thicket to more than a dozen meters up in a tree top; typically, however, it is built around 3 m in a bush, a horizontal branch fork, or in vines. Nesting sites are often solitary bushes, which provide cover while allowing the incubating bird to observe the surrounding terrain for threats.

The female lays three, sometimes two eggs, which are bluish to buff green with brown and lilac spots and measure around 22–27 by 17–19 mm, or about 25 by 18.3 mm on average. Both parents incubate, but the female does most of the work. The eggs hatch after 14–16 days, and nestlings take again as long to fledge. The parents usually destroy the nest after the young have left it. They continue to feed their offspring for about seven more weeks, after which the young can forage on their own. They stay with their parents for about five months.

The black cuckoo (Cuculus clamosus) is a common brood parasite of this boubou, parasitizing about 2 percent of its nests. When tropical boubous spot black cuckoos, they usually try to mob them away and are often successful in this; some pairs, however, seem to be very inept at preventing brood parasitism and may be affected several times per year.

== See also ==
- Animal communication
