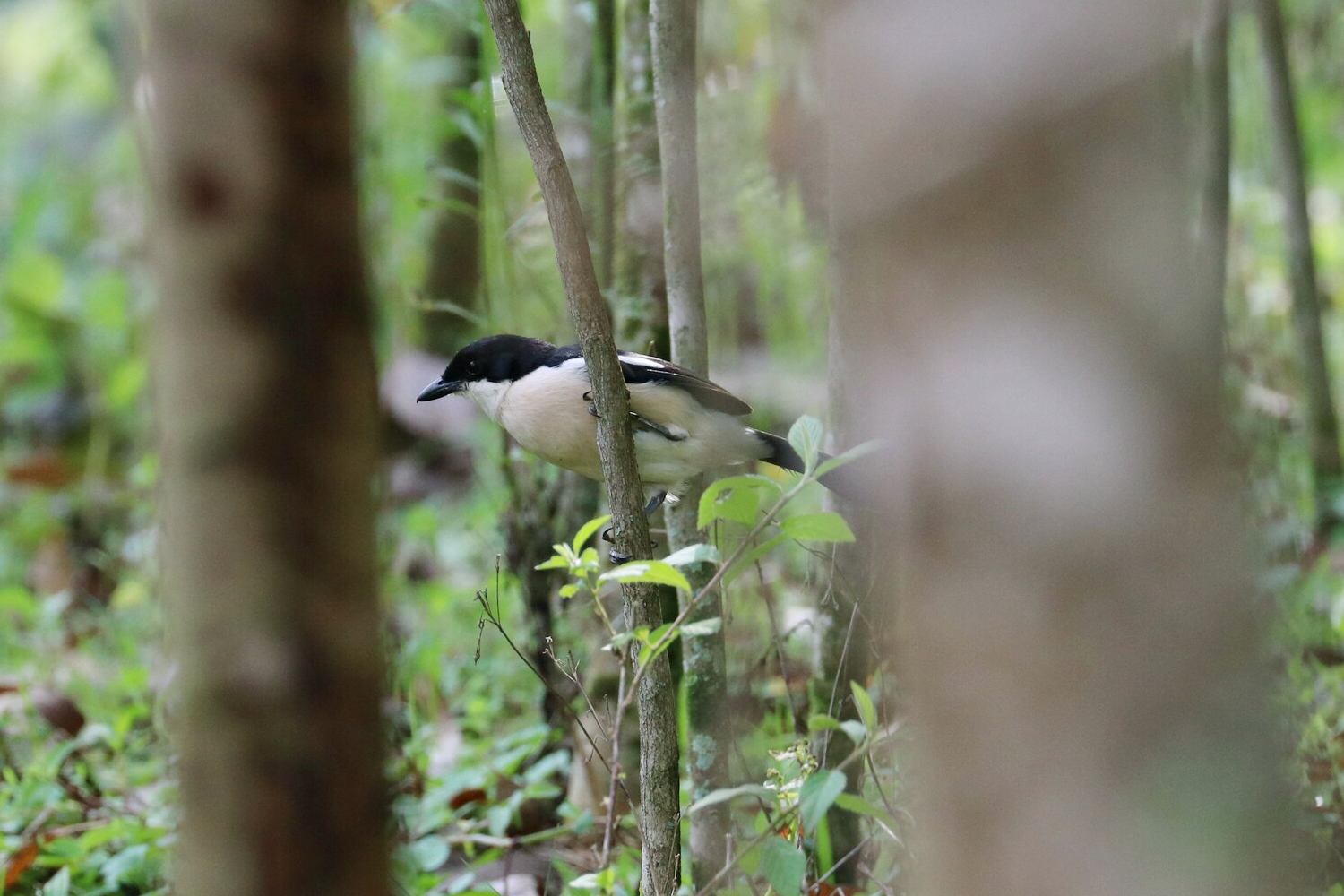

Conservation status
- Least Concern (IUCN 3.1)

Scientific classification
- Kingdom: Animalia
- Phylum: Chordata
- Class: Aves
- Order: Passeriformes
- Family: Malaconotidae
- Genus: Laniarius
- Species: L. aethiopicus

Binomial name
- Laniarius aethiopicus (Gmelin, JF, 1789)

Synonyms
- Laniarius ferrugineus aethiopicus (Gmelin, 1788)

= Ethiopian boubou =

Species of bird

The Ethiopian boubou (Laniarius aethiopicus) is a species of bird in the family Malaconotidae. It is found in Eritrea, Ethiopia, northwest Somalia, and northern Kenya. Its natural habitat is moist savanna.

Its breast and belly are pinkish. It has a narrow wing stripe, extending across the median and larger wing coverts, and often a bit onto the secondary remiges. Outer tail feathers never have white tips.

== Taxonomy ==
The Ethiopian boubou was formally described in 1789 by the German naturalist Johann Friedrich Gmelin in his revised and expanded edition of Carl Linnaeus's Systema Naturae. He placed it with the thrushes in the genus Turdus and coined the binomial name Turdus aethiopicus. Gmelin based his description on "Le merle noire et blanc d'Abyssinie" that had been described in 1775 by the French polymath, the Comte de Buffon. The Ethiopian boubou is now one of 22 species placed in the genus Laniarius that was introduced in 1816 by the French ornithologist Louis Pierre Vieillot. The species is monotypic: no subspecies are recognised.

The Ethiopian boubou was formerly lumped with the tropical boubou, the black boubou, and the East Coast boubou. The species complex was split based on the results of a molecular phylogenetic study published in 2008.

A quill mite, Neoaulonastus malaconotus, has been identified as an ectoparasite of the species. It belongs to the Syringophilinae, a mite subfamily known to infect several bushshrike species.
