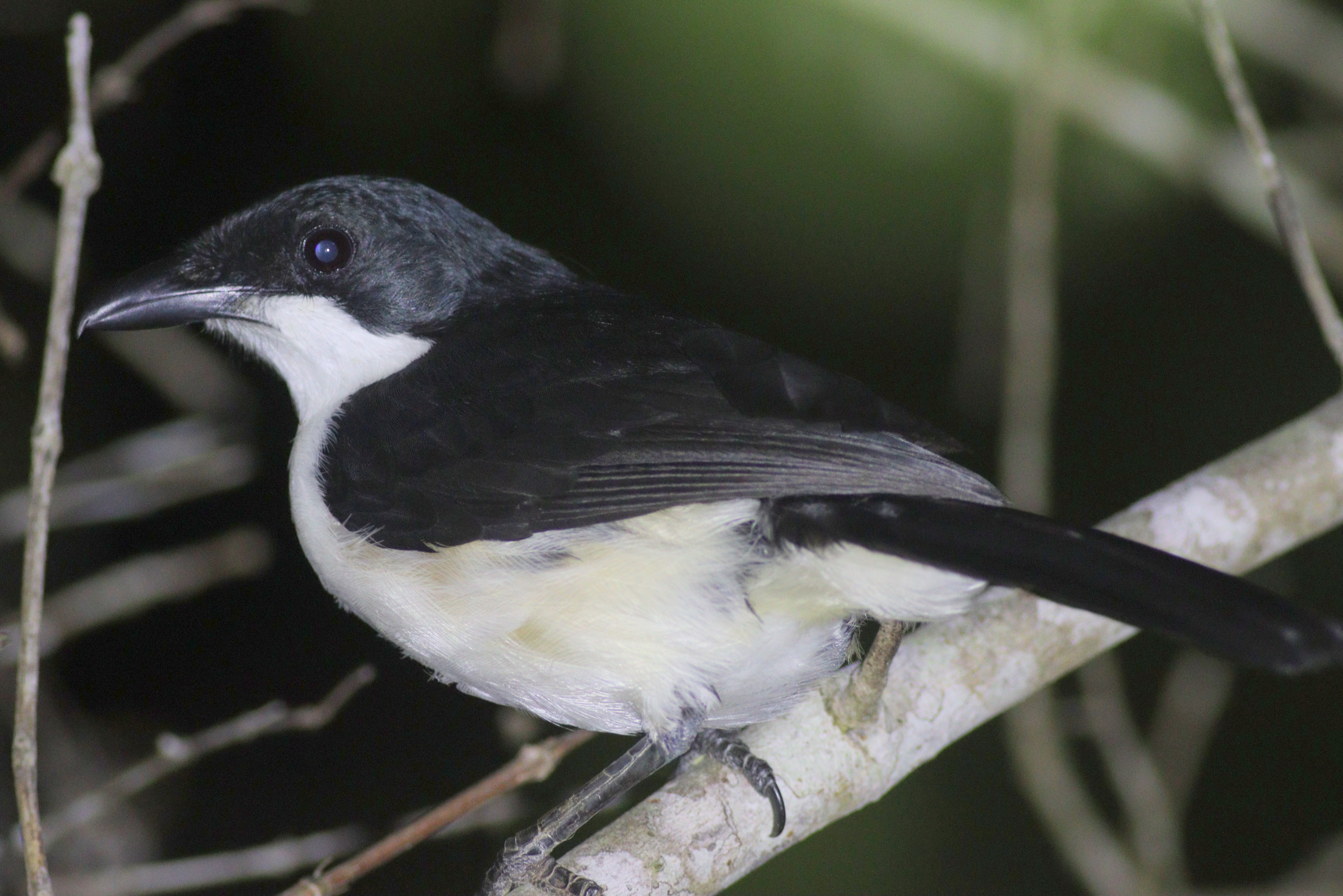

Conservation status
- Least Concern (IUCN 3.1)

Scientific classification
- Kingdom: Animalia
- Phylum: Chordata
- Class: Aves
- Order: Passeriformes
- Family: Malaconotidae
- Genus: Laniarius
- Species: L. sublacteus

Binomial name
- Laniarius sublacteus (Cassin, 1851)

= East Coast boubou =

Species of bird

The East Coast boubou or Zanzibar boubou (Laniarius sublacteus) is a species of bird in the family Malaconotidae. It is found from southeast Somalia to northeast Tanzania, and Zanzibar island.

Its natural habitat is moist savanna.

It has vestigial or no white wing stripe. Outer tail feathers may have white tips. Juveniles have no barring on underside. An all-black morph occurs in the area around the lower Jubba and Tana Rivers and on the Lamu Archipelago.

The East Coast boubou was formerly lumped with the tropical boubou, the black boubou, and the Ethiopian boubou. The species complex was split based on the results of a molecular phylogenetic study published in 2008.
