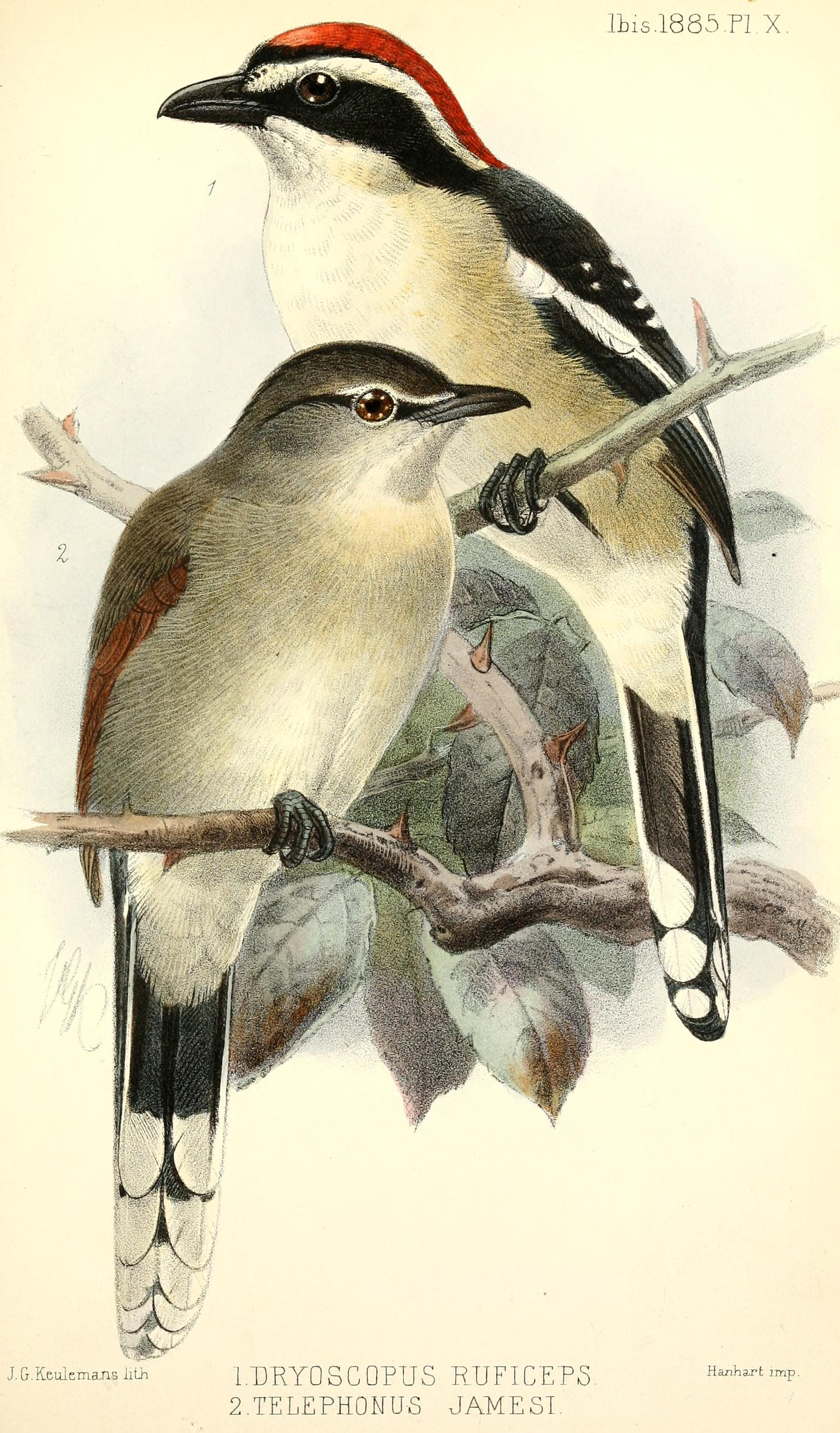
- L. r. kismayensis (top)
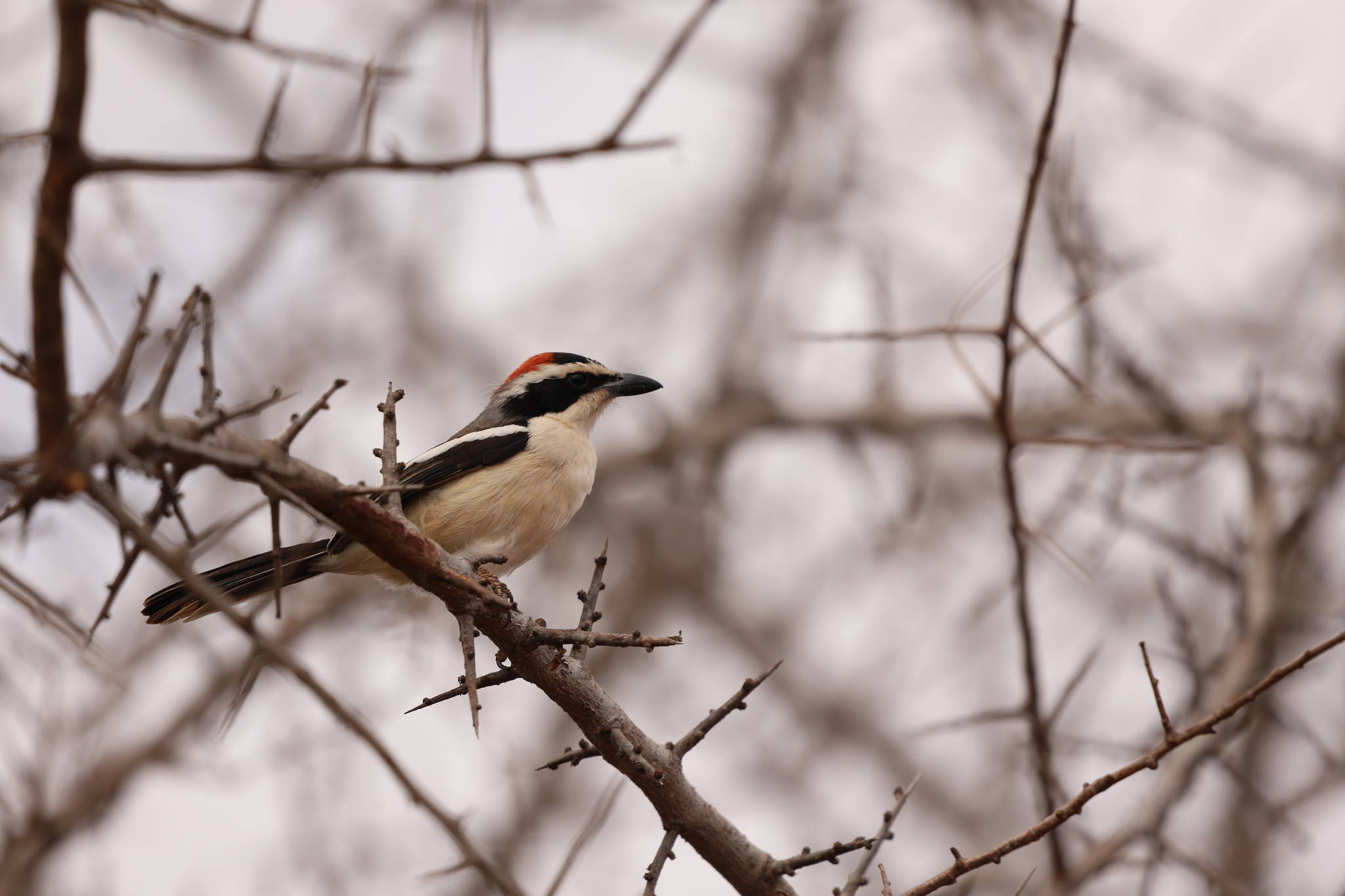

Conservation status
- Least Concern (IUCN 3.1)

Scientific classification
- Kingdom: Animalia
- Phylum: Chordata
- Class: Aves
- Order: Passeriformes
- Family: Malaconotidae
- Genus: Laniarius
- Species: L. ruficeps

Binomial name
- Laniarius ruficeps (Shelley, 1885)

Synonyms
- Dryoscopus ruficeps Shelley, 1885

= Red-naped bushshrike =

Species of bird

The red-naped bushshrike or red-naped boubou (Laniarius ruficeps) is a species of bird in the family Malaconotidae, which is native to the dry lowlands of the eastern Afrotropics.

== Range and habitat ==
It is found in Ethiopia, Kenya, and Somalia. Its natural habitat is subtropical and tropical dry shrubland, under 1,000 m (3,300 ft) above sea level.

== Habits ==
It is a shy and skulking bird, that forages on the ground and in the lower strata of dense thickets and thornbush. It sings just after sunrise from a bushtop. They have various harsh and repetitive calls, which includes dueting.

== Subspecies ==
There are three accepted subspecies:

- Laniarius ruficeps ruficeps (Shelley, 1885) – northern Somalia

Description: Crown to hindneck bright orange-rufous to rufous-red, forecrown black

- Laniarius ruficeps rufinuchalis (Sharpe, 1895) – Ethiopia, central Somalia and Kenya

Description: Forecrown black

- Laniarius ruficeps kismayensis (Erlanger, 1901) – coastal Somalia and Kiunga, Kenya

Description: Forecrown orange-red
