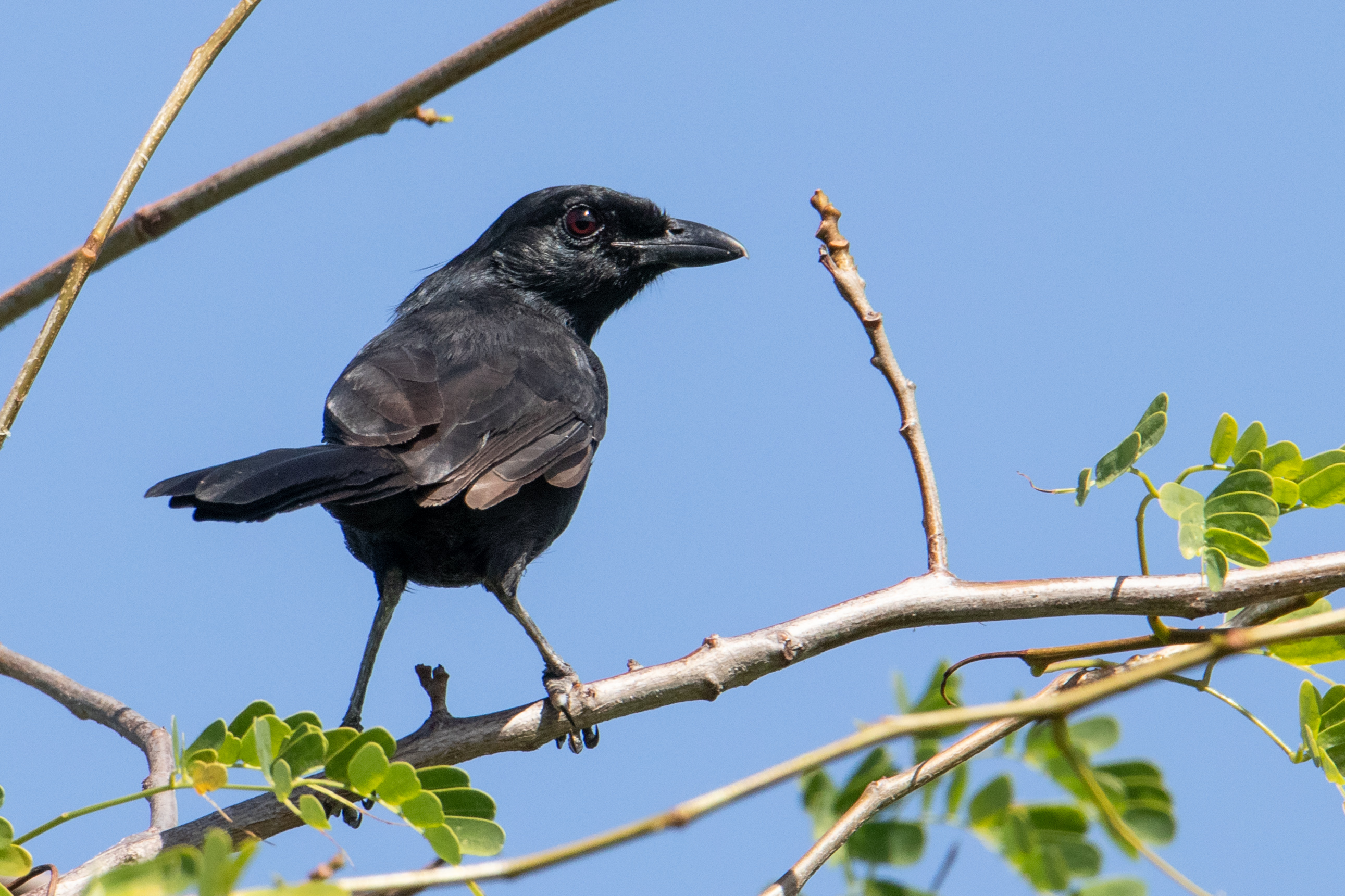
- Black boubou on Manda Island

Conservation status
- Least Concern (IUCN 3.1)

Scientific classification
- Kingdom: Animalia
- Phylum: Chordata
- Class: Aves
- Order: Passeriformes
- Family: Malaconotidae
- Genus: Laniarius
- Species: L. nigerrimus

Binomial name
- Laniarius nigerrimus (Reichenow, 1879)

Synonyms
- Laniarius aethiopicus erlangeri Laniarius aethiopicus somaliensis Laniarius liberatus Laniarius erlangeri

= Black boubou =

Species of bird

The black boubou (Laniarius nigerrimus), also known as Somali boubou, Erlanger's boubou or coastal boubou, is a medium-size bushshrike. It was split from the tropical boubou as a result of DNA sequence analysis, and this change in status was recognized by the International Ornithological Committee in 2008. Two colour morphs are recognized, a predominantly black one, the black boubou, and an extremely rare black and yellow morph which was formerly considered a separate species, the Bulo Burti boubou (Laniarius liberatus). The black boubou is found in Somalia and northern Kenya.

== Description ==
The adult has glossy blue-black except for white spots on the rump, visible when the wings are spread and the rump feathers are erected. The underparts are white with a buffy or pinkish tinge on the breast and flanks. The bill is black; the eyes are dark reddish brown. The wings have white median coverts. The juvenile is similar but duller, with a greyish-brown bill, the upperparts mottled by yellowish-ochre to tawny feather tips, and dusky-barred flanks. The Somali boubou differs from tropical boubou in that it is smaller and has less white in the wing.

== Bulo Burti boubou ==
The "Bulo Burti boubou", formerly recognized as a distinct species, Laniarius liberatus, was only known from one individual trapped in 1988 in central Somalia, 140 km inland in Hiiraan (region) near Buuloburde (Buulobarde, Bulo Burti) on the Shebelle River, and was described using blood and feather samples to provide a DNA sequence. Apparently for the first time for a modern bird description, no specimen (either the bird or a part of it) was kept as a type; the bird was released back into the wild in 1990 because the scientists who caught it felt that the species was very rare. The blood and feather samples were destroyed in the process of sequencing. The epithet liberatus ("the liberated one") was given because of this. It was not found during searches in 1989 and 1990. It resembles the red-naped bushshrike L. ruficeps but has no red nape, is black, not grey, on the mantle, and is washed buffy-yellow on throat and breast.

This presumed species was considered critically endangered by Birdlife International.

In 2008, a new review of the molecular sequence data revealed the identity of the Bulo Burti boubou as a colour morph of Laniarius nigerrimus (traditionally considered a subspecies of tropical boubou). Following the 2008 study the International Ornithological Committee recognized L. nigerrimus as distinct species and put L. liberatus into the synonymity of L. nigerrimus.
