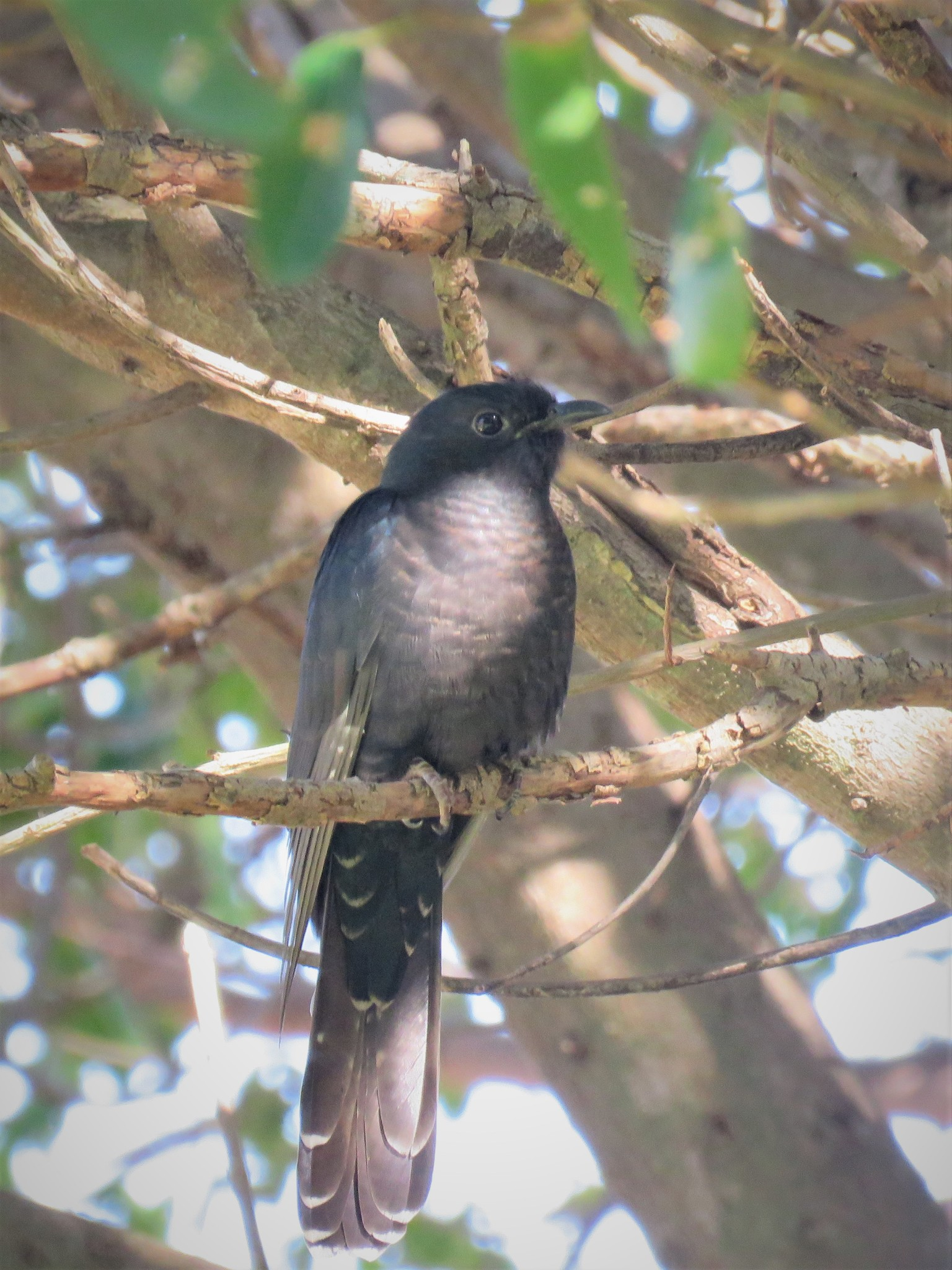
- Subspecies C. c. clamosus, Pietermaritzburg, South Africa

Conservation status
- Least Concern (IUCN 3.1)

Scientific classification
- Kingdom: Animalia
- Phylum: Chordata
- Class: Aves
- Order: Cuculiformes
- Family: Cuculidae
- Genus: Cuculus
- Species: C. clamosus

Binomial name
- Cuculus clamosus Latham, 1801

= Black cuckoo =

Species of bird

The black cuckoo (Cuculus clamosus) is a species of cuckoo in the family Cuculidae. The species is distributed widely across sub-Saharan Africa. There are two subspecies. This cuckoo has a very wide range and is quite common so it is classified as a least-concern species by the International Union for Conservation of Nature.

== Description ==
The black cuckoo is a medium-sized cuckoo. The sexes are similar, the plumage varying by subspecies; Cuculus clamosus clamosus has upper parts black glossed with green, slatey-grey wings and black tail tipped with white and sometimes with the outer feathers barred or spotted with white or buff; Cuculus clamosus gabonensis is mostly black with a red throat and black and white barring on the belly.

== Distribution and habitat ==
The subspecies Cuculus clamosus gabonensis is a resident in Central Africa, whereas the Southern African subspecies Cuculus clamosus clamosus is migratory, breeding in Southern Africa in September to December, then moving in March to Central, Eastern and West Africa. The range of this species extends from Liberia to Ethiopia in the east and Angola and South Africa. It is a woodland bird but avoids the interior of dense forests, preferring acacia woodland, thickets, riverside woodland, plantations and trees around villages.

== Ecology ==
The black cuckoo feeds mainly on hairy caterpillars but also consumes termites and ants, including winged ones caught in flight, beetles, grasshoppers and other insects, as well as birds' eggs and nestlings.

The black cuckoo is a brood parasite. Its main hosts are bushshrikes, particularly the tropical boubou and crimson-breasted shrike. When parasitising the boubou, the eggs hatch after about fourteen days, three days before the boubou's eggs. The cuckoo chick evicts other eggs and nestlings usually within thirty hours of hatching. It is fledged in about sixteen days and leaves the nest a few days later. The foster parents continue to feed it for another three weeks.
