= Scrub robin =

Scrub robin is part of the common name for species of birds in three different genera in two families, and may refer to:

- Family Muscicapidae
  - Genus Cercotrichas
    - Kalahari scrub robin (Cercotrichas paena)
    - Black scrub robin (Cercotrichas podobe)
    - Rufous-tailed scrub robin (Cercotrichas galactotes)
    - Brown-backed scrub robin (Cercotrichas hartlaubi)
    - White-browed scrub robin (Cercotrichas leucophrys)
  - Genus Tychaedon
    - Karoo scrub robin (Tychaedon coryphoeus)
    - Brown scrub robin (Tychaedon signata)
    - Forest scrub robin (Tychaedon leucosticta)
    - Bearded scrub robin (Tychaedon quadrivirgata)
    - Miombo scrub robin (Tychaedon barbata)
- Family Petroicidae
  - Genus Drymodes
    - Southern scrub robin (Drymodes brunneopygia)
    - Northern scrub robin (Drymodes superciliaris)
    - Papuan scrub robin (Drymodes beccarii)
