= Blouberg Nature Reserve =

South African nature reserve

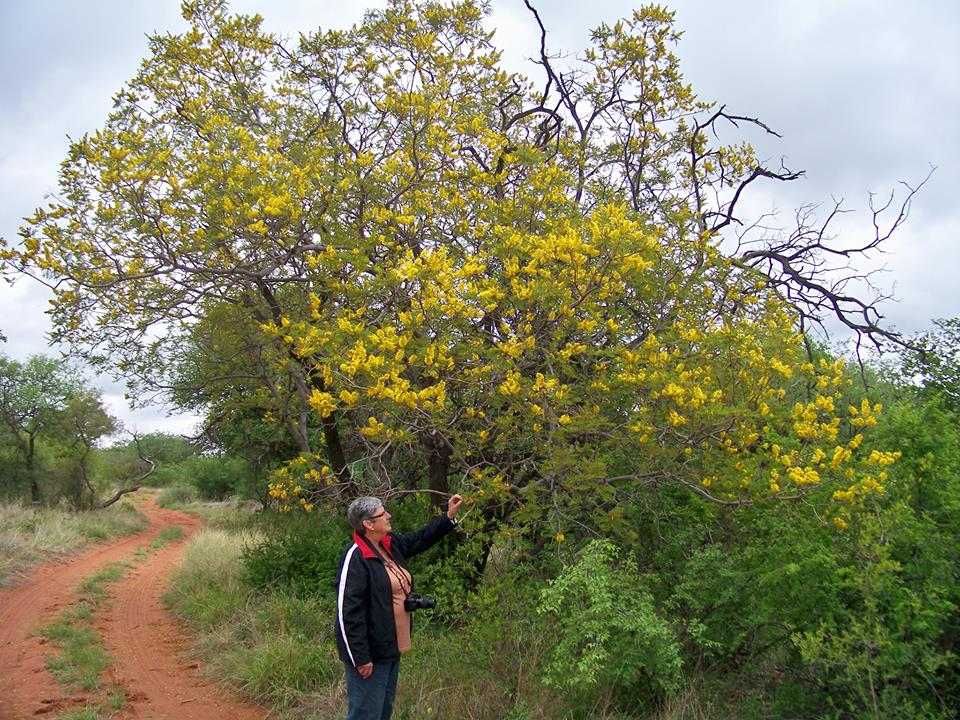
- Interactive map of Blouberg Nature Reserve
- Location: Limpopo, South Africa
- Nearest city: Vivo
- Coordinates: 23°01′S 29°06′E
- Area: 9,360 hectares (23,100 acres)
- Established: 1990
- Administrator: Limpopo Provincial Government

Blouberg Nature Reserve is a protected area situated close to Vivo, west of Louis Trichardt in the Limpopo Province, of South Africa. It covers an area of 9,360 hectares (23,100 acres) from the eastern portion of the Blouberg mountain range to the savanna near the Brak River, Blouberg was established as a protected area in 1990 by Peter G Dix. The reserve is currently managed and administered by the Limpopo Provincial Government Department of Economic Development, Environment & Tourism

== Topography and habitats ==
Its topography renders a diverse array of habitats which in turn accommodate numerous species of plant and animal life. This reserve is well known for the largest breeding colony of Cape vultures in South Africa in its mountainous sector. On the plain sector game is abundant with special mention of Cape buffalo, sable antelope and leopard. It is predominately bushveld savanna with Baobabs and Tamboti Trees standing prominently on the northern plains. Natural forest occurs on the mountain's southern slopes, which includes a large Outeniqua yellowwood, which was given official protection in 2013.

== Visitor facilities ==
Current accommodation consists of chalets at Mashatu camp, Tamboti tented bush camp, Modumele Wilderness Camp and Molope Camp. A vehicle with high ground clearance is needed, especially for the southern part. Although it is an ideal stopover for the Tuli Block in Botswana, the Mapungubwe National Park on the Zimbabwe border or the northern part of Kruger Park, the reserve is worth a proper visit in itself.

== Animals ==
Animal species found in the reserve:

Aardvark	Aardwolf	Southern African wildcat	Baboon	Black-backed jackal	Brown hyena
Buffalo	Bushbaby	Bushbuck	Bushpig	Caracal	Cheetah
Civet	Common duiker	Common dwarf mongoose	Eland	Gemsbuck	Giraffe
Honey badger	Impala	Klipspringer	Kudu	Rusty-spotted genet	Leopard
Mountain reedbuck	Pangolin	Porcupine	Red hartebeest	Sable	Spotted hyena
Steenbuck	Banded mongoose	Vervet monkey	Warthog	Waterbuck	Zebra

Bird species found in the reserve:

Acacia pied barbet	African black swift	African cuckoo	African dusky flycatcher	African firefinch	African fish eagle
African golden oriole	African goshawk	African grey hornbill	African harrier-hawk	African hawk-eagle	African palm swift
African paradise flycatcher	African pipit	African pygmy kingfisher	African red-eyed bulbul	African scops owl	Alpine swift
Amethyst sunbird	Ant-eating chat	Arrow-marked babbler	Banded martin	Barn owl	Barn swallow
Barred wren-warbler	Bar-throated apalis	Bateleur	Bearded scrub robin	Bearded woodpecker	Black cuckoo
Black stork	Black-backed puffback	Black-chested snake eagle	Black-collared barbet	Black-crowned night heron	Black-crowned tchagra
Black-faced waxbill	Black-headed heron	Black-headed oriole	Blacksmith lapwing	Black-winged kite	Black-winged stilt
Blue waxbill	Bronze-winged courser	Brown snake eagle	Brown-backed honeybird	Brown-crowned tchagra	Brown-hooded kingfisher
Brubru	White-browed coucal	Burchell's starling	Burnt-necked eremomela	Bushveld pipit	Cape batis
Cape rock thrush	Cape starling	Cape vulture	Cape white-eye	Cardinal woodpecker	Cattle egret
Chestnut-vented warbler	Chinspot batis	Cinnamon roller	Cinnamon-breasted bunting	Collared sunbird	Common bulbul
Common buttonquail	Common quail	Common scimitarbill	Common waxbill	Crested barbet	Crested francolin
Crested guineafowl	Crimson-breasted shrike	Crowned lapwing	Cut-throat finch	Dark chanting goshawk	Desert cisticola
Diederik cuckoo	Double-banded courser	Double-banded sandgrouse	Egyptian goose	Emerald-spotted wood dove	Eurasian spoonbill
European bee-eater	European nightjar	European roller	Fiery-necked nightjar	Fork-tailed drongo	Freckled nightjar
Gabar goshawk	Golden-breasted bunting	Golden-tailed woodpecker	Gorgeous bushshrike	Greater blue-eared starling	Greater double-collared sunbird
Greater honeyguide	Greater painted-snipe	Greater striped swallow	Green wood hoopoe	Green-backed camaroptera	Green-backed twinspot
Green-winged pytilia	Grey go-away-bird	Grey heron	Grey penduline tit	Grey tit-flycatcher	Grey-backed camaroptera
Grey-headed bushshrike	Grey-headed kingfisher	Groundscraper thrush	Hadada ibis	Hamerkop	Helmeted guineafowl
Hooded vulture	Hoopoe	Jacobin cuckoo	Jameson's firefinch	Kalahari scrub robin	Karoo thrush
Klaas's cuckoo	Knob-billed duck	Kori bustard	Kurrichane thrush	Lanner falcon	Lappet-faced vulture
Laughing dove	Lesser grey shrike	Lesser honeyguide	Lesser striped swallow	Levaillant's cisticola	Levaillant's cuckoo
Lilac-breasted roller	Little bee-eater	Little sparrowhawk	Lizard buzzard	Long-billed crombec	Long-tailed paradise whydah
Long-tailed widowbird	Magpie shrike	Malachite kingfisher	Marabou stork	Marico flycatcher	Marico sunbird
Martial eagle	Meves's Starling	Mocking cliff chat	Monotonous lark	Mountain wheatear	Namaqua dove
Natal spurfowl	Neddicky	Olive bushshrike	Orange-breasted bushshrike	Ostrich	Ovambo sparrowhawk
Pale chanting goshawk	Pale flycatcher	Pearl-breasted swallow	Pearl-spotted owlet	Peregrine falcon	Pied crow
Purple roller	Purple-crested turaco	Rattling cisticola	Red-backed shrike	Red-billed buffalo weaver	Red-billed oxpecker
Red-billed quelea	Red-billed teal	Red-breasted swallow	Red-capped lark	Red-capped robin-chat	Red-chested cuckoo
Red-crested korhaan	Red-eyed dove	Red-faced mousebird	Red-headed weaver	Red-winged starling	Retz's helmetshrike
Ring-necked dove	Rock kestrel	Rock martin	Rufous-naped lark	Rüppell's vulture	Sabota lark
Scaly-feathered weaver	Scarlet-chested sunbird	Secretarybird	Shikra	Sombre greenbul	Southern black flycatcher
Southern black tit	Southern boubou	Southern carmine bee-eater	Southern grey-headed sparrow	Southern ground hornbill	Southern masked weaver
Southern pied babbler	Southern pochard	Southern red-billed hornbill	Southern red bishop	Southern white-crowned shrike	Southern white-faced owl
Southern yellow-billed hornbill	Speckled mousebird	Speckled pigeon	Spectacled weaver	Spotted eagle-owl	Spotted flycatcher
Spotted thick-knee	Spur-winged goose	Steppe eagle	Striped kingfisher	Swainson's spurfowl	Swallow-tailed bee-eater
Tambourine dove	Tawny eagle	Tawny-flanked prinia	Terrestrial brownbul	Three-banded courser	Thrush nightingale
Verreaux's eagle	Verreaux's eagle-owl	Violet-backed starling	Violet-eared waxbill	Wahlberg's eagle	Wattled starling
White stork	White-backed vulture	White-bellied sunbird	White-browed robin-chat	White-browed scrub robin	White-browed sparrow-weaver
White-crested helmetshrike	White-faced whistling duck	White-fronted bee-eater	White-rumped swift	White-throated robin-chat	White-winged widowbird
Willow warbler	Woodland kingfisher	Yellow-bellied eremomela	Yellow-bellied greenbul	Yellow-billed kite	Yellow-breasted apalis
Yellow-fronted canary	Yellow-fronted tinkerbird	Zitting cisticola			

== Site locations ==
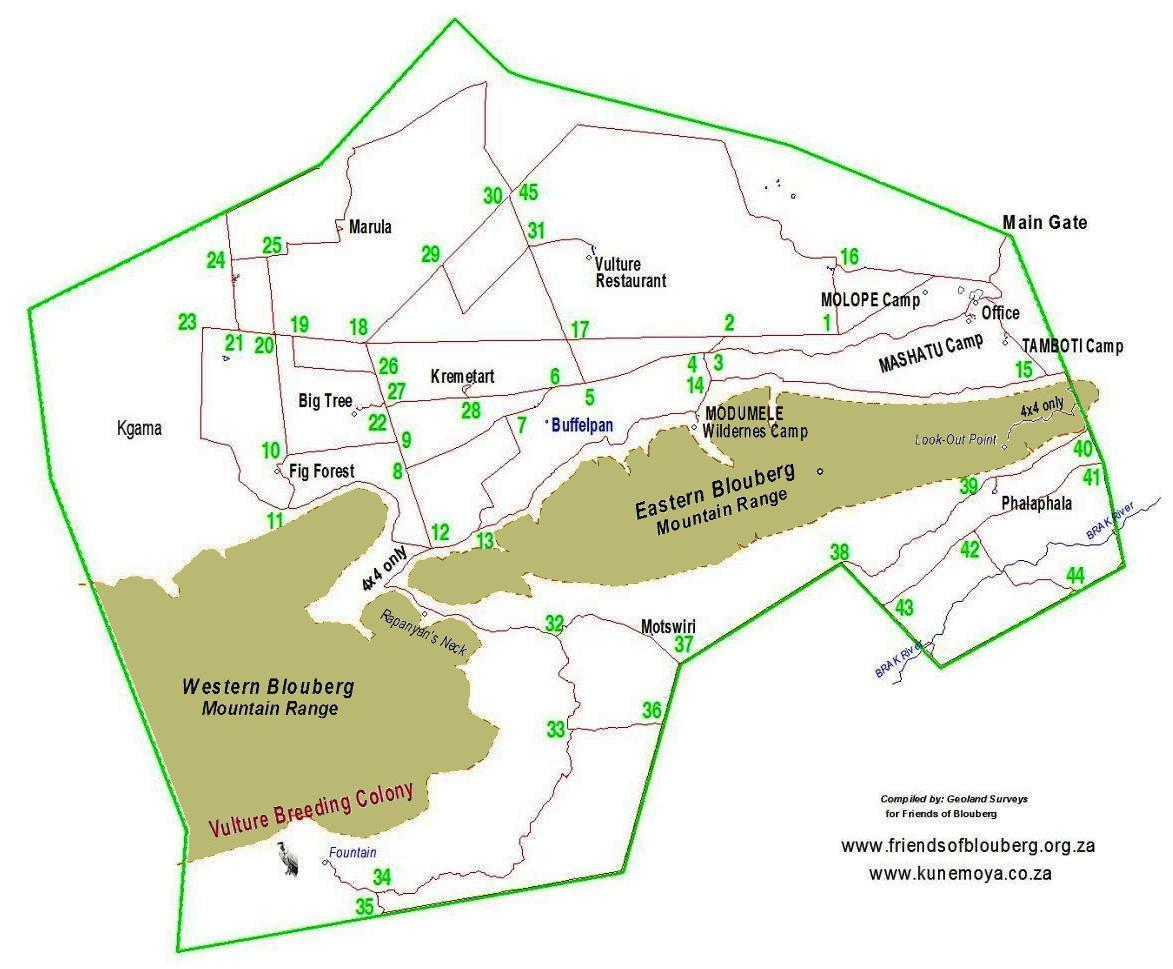
Map of the nature reserve

- Main gate 22°58′36″S 29°09′03″E
- Office 22°59′03″S 29°08′51″E
- Mashatu camp 22°59′11″S 29°08′48″E
- Tamboti camp 22°59′19″S 29°09′04″E
- Molope camp 22°59′02″S 29°08′28″E
- Modumele camp 22°59′53″S 29°06′48″E
- Vulture Restaurant 22°58′48″S 29°06′03″E
- Big Tree 22°59′47″S 29°04′20″E
- Fig Forest 23°00′11″S 29°03′47″E
- Look-out point 23°00′01″S 29°09′03″E
- Fountain 23°02′48″S 29°04′08″E
- Rapanyana's Neck 23°01′09″S 29°04′51″E

== See also ==
- Protected areas of South Africa
- Blouberg (range)
- Soutpansberg Conservancy
