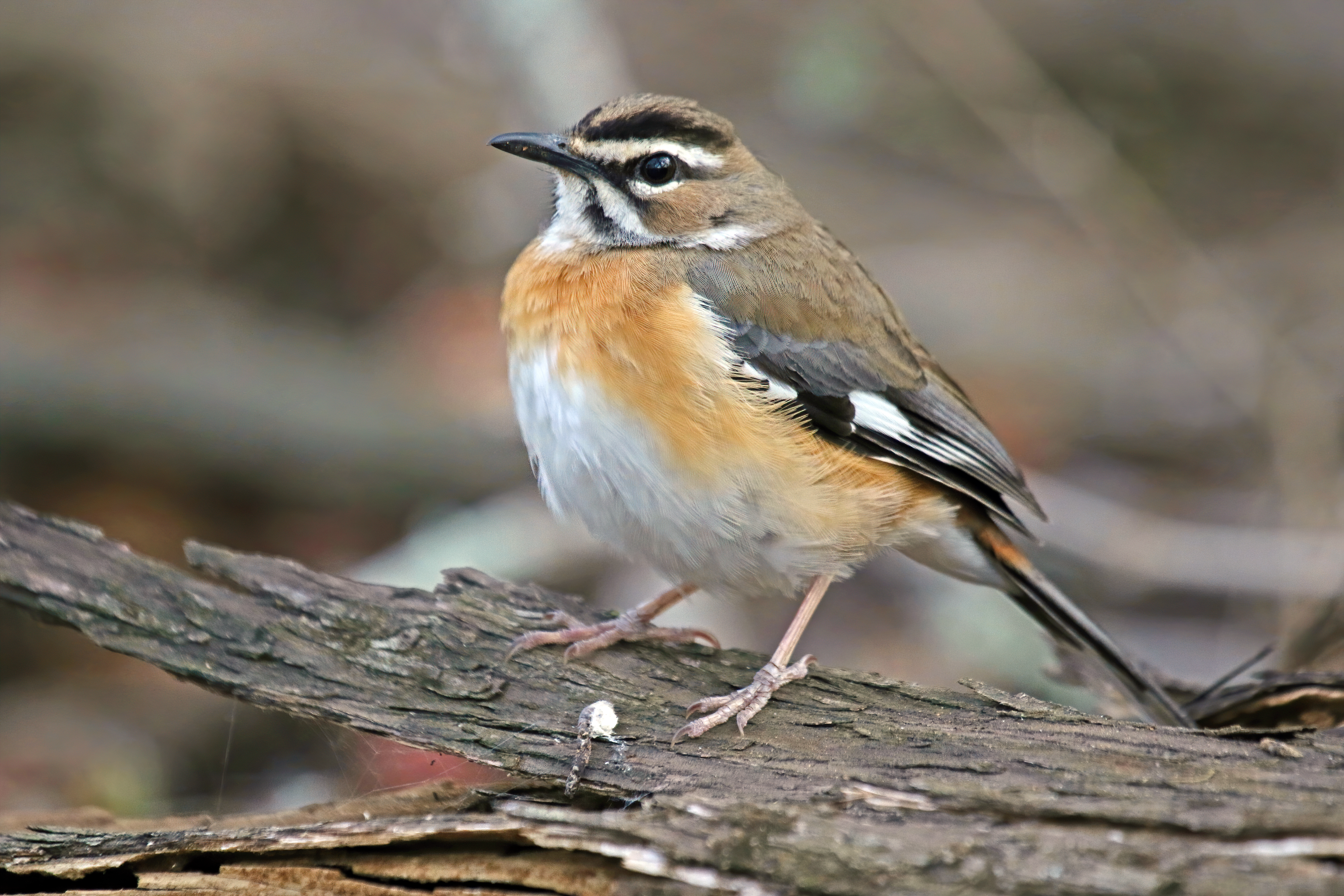
- At Phinda Private Game Reserve, KwaZulu Natal, South Africa.

Conservation status
- Least Concern (IUCN 3.1)

Scientific classification
- Kingdom: Animalia
- Phylum: Chordata
- Class: Aves
- Order: Passeriformes
- Family: Muscicapidae
- Genus: Tychaedon
- Species: T. quadrivirgata

Binomial name
- Tychaedon quadrivirgata (Reichenow, 1879)

Synonyms
- Cercotrichas quadrivirgata Erythropygia quadrivirgata Thamnobia quadrivirgata

= Bearded scrub robin =

Species of bird

The bearded scrub robin (Tychaedon quadrivirgata), also known as the eastern bearded scrub robin, is a species of bird in the family Muscicapidae. It is found in eastern and southern Africa. This species was formerly placed in the genus Cercotrichas.

== Taxonomy ==
This species was described as Thamnobia quadrivirgata by the German ornithologist Anton Reichenow in 1879. It was formerly placed in the genus Erythropygia. It forms a superspecies with the forest scrub robin, miombo scrub robin and brown scrub robin. Two subspecies of T. quadrivirgata are recognized: T. q. greenwayi in the Zanzibar and Mafia Islands, and T. q. quadrivirgata in the rest of the range. The specific epithet quadrivirgata means "four-striped" in Latin. The species is so named because of four diagnostic stripes on its face.

== Description ==
Its length is 15–17 cm (5.9–6.7 in), and its weight is approximately 20–31 g (0.71–1.09 oz). The male and female are alike, with the female being slightly smaller. The crown and upperparts are mostly dark olive-brown. The tail is dark brown, with the outer feathers having white tips. The wing coverts are grey-brown with olive-brown edges. The flight feathers are dark brown, with a white patch. On the face, there are a white supercilium, a white crescent shape below the eye, a white moustachial line, and a black malar stripe. There are also black lines above the supercilia. The eyes are dark brown and the lores are black. The throat and upper breast are white. The breast and neck-sides are rufous-brown to rufous. The belly and undertail coverts are white. The beak is black, and the legs are pinkish-brown. The juvenile is paler brown, with black patterns on its crown and back, and its underparts are buff, with dark patterns. C. q. greenwayi has greyer upperparts, a duller rump, and a paler breast.

== Distribution and habitat ==
It is found in Botswana, Eswatini, Kenya, Malawi, Mozambique, Namibia, Somalia, South Africa, Tanzania, Zambia, and Zimbabwe, with a distribution size estimated at 5,390,000 km^{2} (2,080,000 sq mi). It is mostly found at elevations of below about 1,000 m (3,300 ft). Its occurs in sand forests, riverine woodland, scrubs, evergreen forests, and sometimes gardens and reedbeds, but usually not in damp areas. In the 1950s, deforestation near Hluhluwe and False Bay destroyed some of its habitat, but in some areas, its range may have expanded. In the 1940s, tsetse deterrent was sprayed in Hluhluwe-Umfolozi Game Reserve, and bearded scrub robins disappeared, but they recolonized the area by 1975. The species has also expanded into Matobo National Park and Richards Bay.

== Behaviour ==
The bearded scrub robin is usually found in pairs or small groups. Its calls include chuck, chrrrt, chek-chek-kwezzzzzzz and seeeep. Its song is a series of melodious whistles and may mimic some other species of birds. It forages on the ground, eating ants, termites, beetles and other insects. It often sandbathes. The mating system is monogamous. It is territorial, defending territories that can reach 1 hectare (2.5 acres) in area. The breeding season ranges from December to February in eastern Africa, September to January in Malawi, Zambia and Zimbabwe, and September to December in South Africa. The nest is made of plants, lichen and hair. The clutch size is two to three eggs. The eggs may be white, pale green or bluish, and have many spots. The female incubates the eggs.

== Status ==
The population size of this species is not known. It has a large range, appears to have a stable population trend and does not appear to have substantial threats, so the IUCN Red List has listed the species as least concern.
