= Charles Richmond =

Charles Richmond may refer to:

- Charles Wallace Richmond (1868–1932), American ornithologist
- Charlie Richmond (referee) (born 1968), Scottish former football referee
