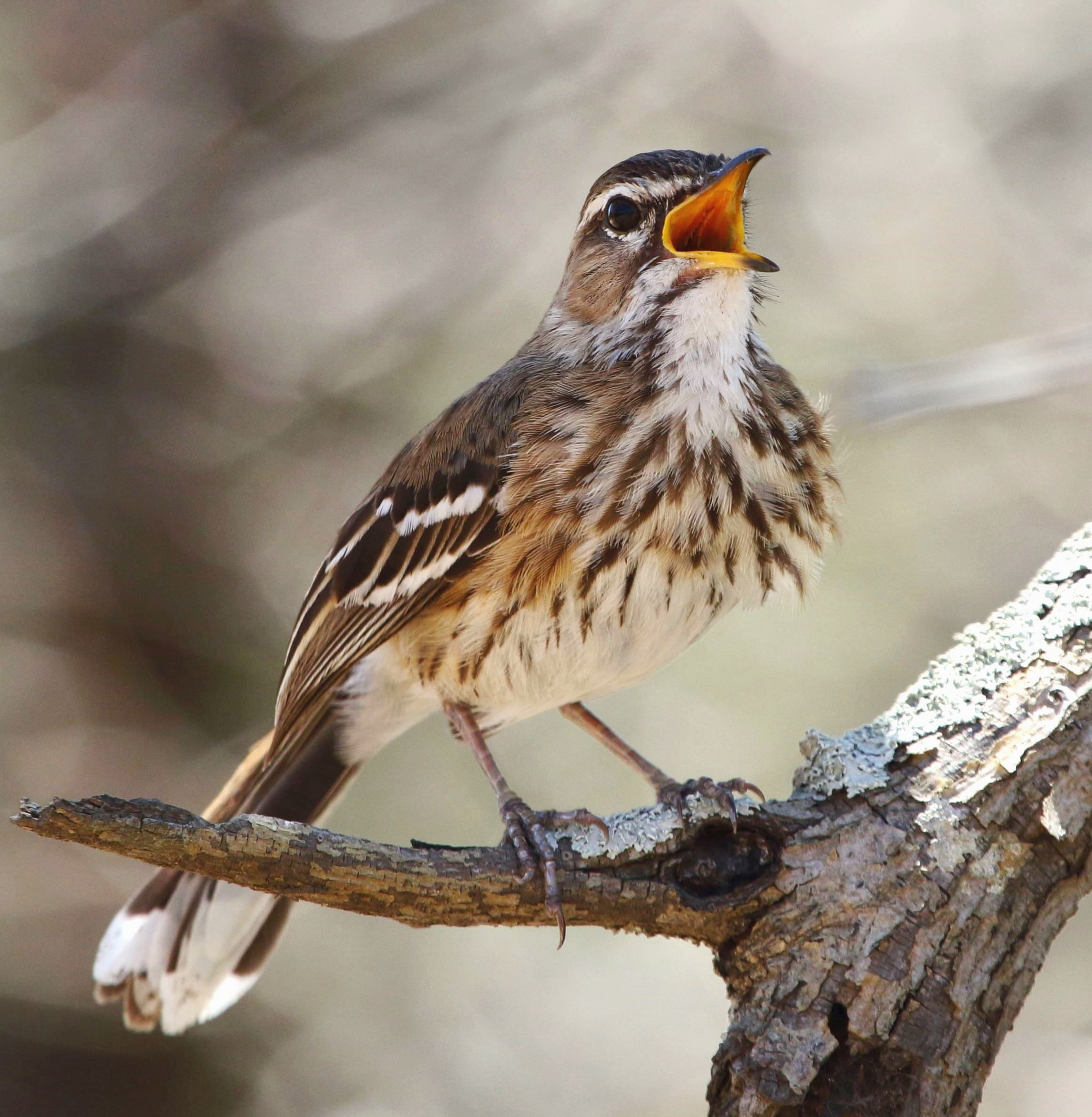

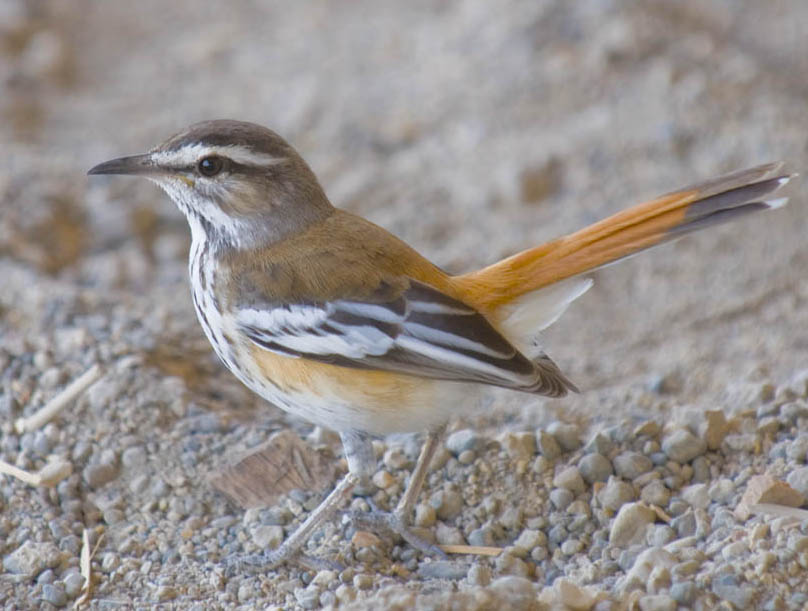
- C. l. pectoralis (above) in South Africa and C. l. zambesiana (below), Tanzania Song of C. l. pectoralis recorded in the northern Kruger National Park, South Africa

Conservation status
- Least Concern (IUCN 3.1)

Scientific classification
- Kingdom: Animalia
- Phylum: Chordata
- Class: Aves
- Order: Passeriformes
- Family: Muscicapidae
- Genus: Cercotrichas
- Species: C. leucophrys

Binomial name
- Cercotrichas leucophrys (Vieillot, 1817)
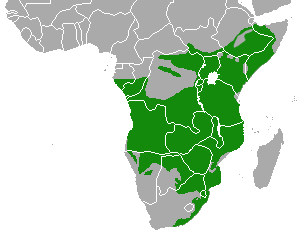
- resident range

Synonyms
- Erythropygia zambesiana Erythropygia ruficauda Erythropygia leucophrys

= White-browed scrub robin =

Species of bird

The white-browed scrub robin (Cercotrichas leucophrys), also known as the red-backed scrub-robin, is a species of bird in the family Muscicapidae. It is native to sub-Saharan Africa, especially East and southern Africa. Within range, its Turdus-like song is one of the often-heard sounds of the bush. The flitting of the tail is characteristic of this species, but also of some near relatives.

== Taxonomy ==
Louis Pierre Vieillot described the white-browed scrub robin in 1817. The specific epithet is derived from the Ancient Greek words leukos "white" and ǒphrys "eyebrow".

== Subspecies ==
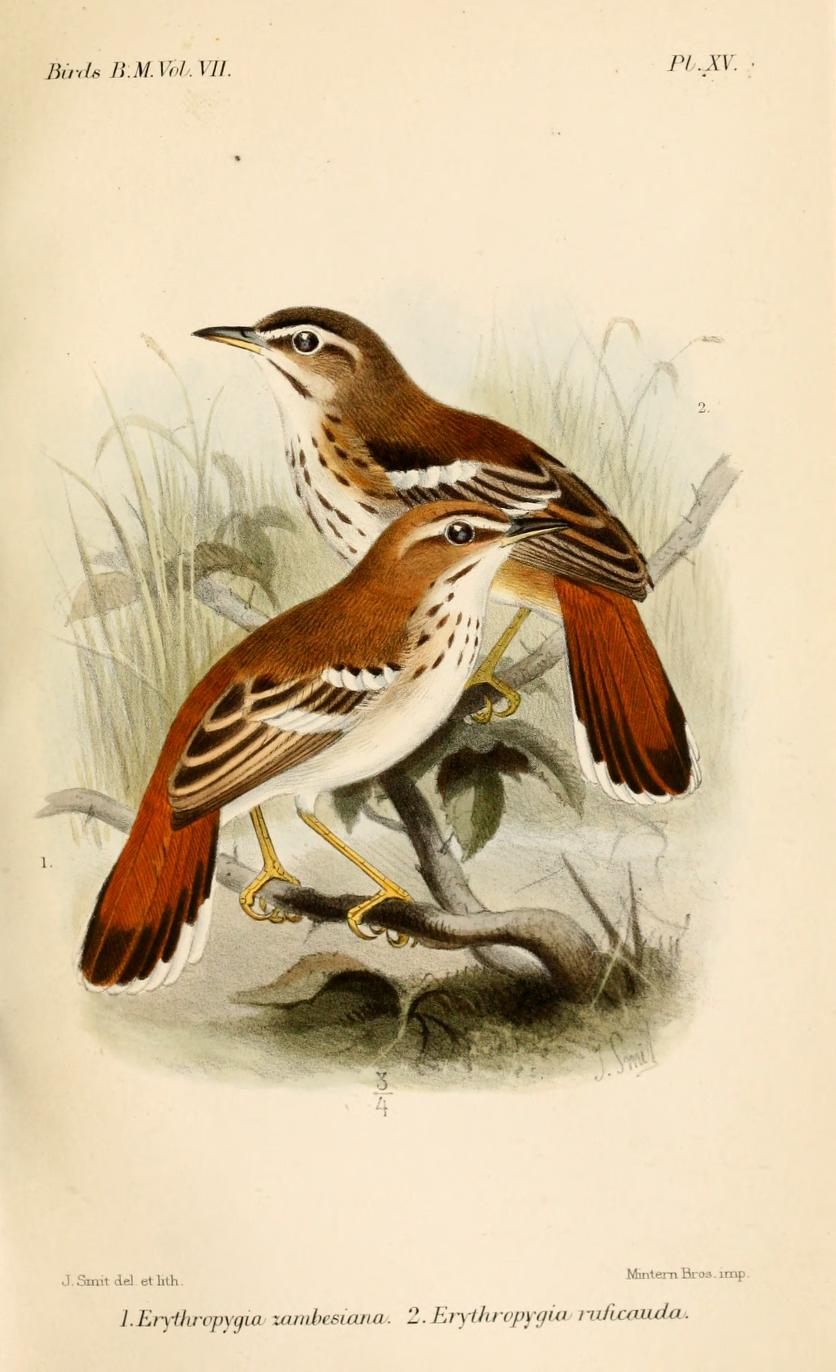
front: E. l. zambesiana Sharpe, 1882, back: E. l. munda (Cabanis, 1880), illustrated by Joseph Smit Note: yellow leg colour inaccurate

For the white-browed scrub robin, some 9 to 12 subspecies are recognized: Two groups of subspecies are recognised, namely the 'white-winged' group of arid country, and the 'red-backed' group of mesic to moist habitats. Intergradation between these is apparently limited to subspecies brunneiceps and vulpina around Simba, Kenya. Otherwise the variation is clinal, though the extremes may be quite distinct.

=== 'White-winged' group ===
- C. l. leucoptera (Rüppell, 1845) – arid woodlands, from South Sudan to Lake Turkana and Horn of Africa
- C. l. eluta (Bowen, 1934) – dry woodlands, from Ethiopia to s Somalia and Tana River, Kenya
- C. l. vulpina (Reichenow, 1891) – dry woodlands of eastern Kenyan and Tanzanian interior

=== 'Red-backed' group ===
- C. l. brunneiceps (Reichenow, 1891) – along Rift valley and Crater Highlands to Mt Meru
- C. l. sclateri (Grote, 1930) – Mbulu Highlands to Tarangire in Tanzanian interior
- C. l. zambesiana (Sharpe, 1882) – West of Rift Valley and along Great Lakes to east coast (South Sudan to central Mozambique)
- C. l. munda (Cabanis, 1880) – southern Gabon to central Angola
- C. l. ovamboensis (Neumann, 1920) – parts of Angola, Namibia, Zambia and Zimbabwe
- C. l. leucophrys (Vieillot, 1817) – southern Zimbabwe and Mozambique to southern South Africa

Following Clancey, the nominate subspecies is sometimes restricted to the Eastern Cape region, and the following subspecies are then distinguished from it:

- C. l. pectoralis (A.Smith, 1836) – southern Zimbabwe, eastern Botswana and northern South Africa
- C. l. simulator Clancey, 1964 – southern Mozambique and Eswatini
- C. l. streptitans Clancey, 1975 – KwaZulu-Natal

== Description ==
The white-browed scrub robin measures 14.0–16.5 cm from bill tip to tail tip and the sexes are alike. The pale superciliary stripe is distinct, and the crown may be warm brown, olive brown or greyish brown. The wings are dusky but well-marked. Greater and lesser wing coverts are always white-tipped, but the secondaries are with or without white edging. Amount of streaking on the breast is very variable, in subsp. ovamboensis it is reduced to fine streaking encircling the throat. The breast and flanks are washed with a variable amount of tawny buff. The mantle and back is brownish to hazel or rufous, depending on the subspecies. The tail is greyish brown to rufous, with a black subterminal band and white feather tips and corners. Juveniles are mottled but with the tail pattern of adults.

== Distribution and habitat ==
The white-browed scrub robin is found in Angola, Botswana, Burundi, Republic of the Congo, DRC, Djibouti, Eswatini, Ethiopia, Gabon, Kenya, Malawi, Mozambique, Namibia, Rwanda, Somalia, South Africa, South Sudan, Tanzania, Uganda, Zambia, and Zimbabwe. Its range spans tropical, subtropical and temperate latitudes. It is present and usually common in any mesic to arid woodland or savanna, provided that there is cover, open scrub or thickets. In the Eastern Highlands it is only present up to 1,400 metres, and in East Africa up to 1,500 metres. It is replaced on the Kalahari sands by the Kalahari scrub robin, while in the Horn of Africa it is sympatric with the rufous bush chat, which lacks any white in the wings. Suitable habitat is usually grassy, which facilitates nesting.

== Behaviour ==
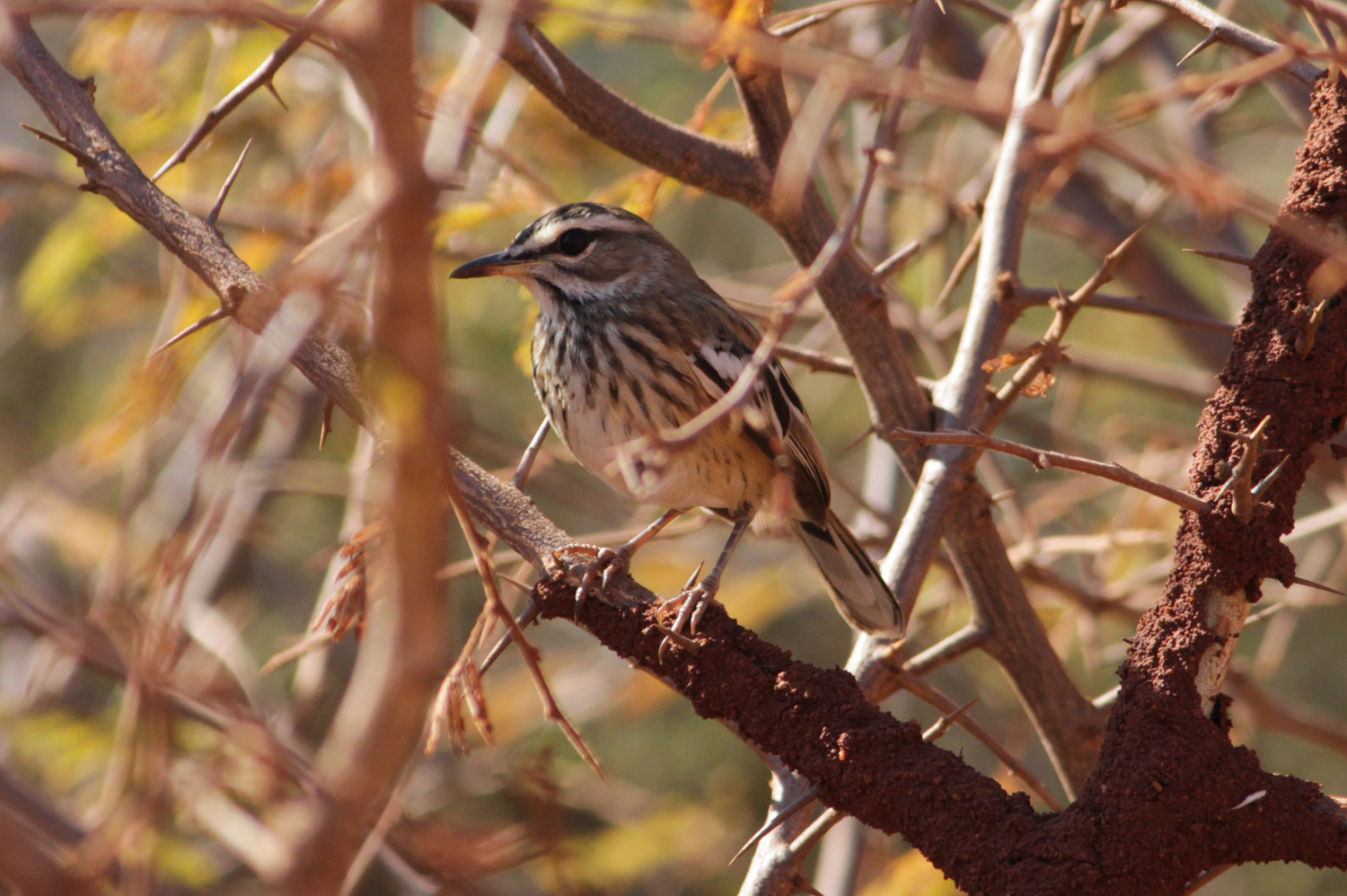
Visiting termite galleries

C. l. pectoralis song in the northern Kruger National Park, South Africa

Sedentary except in the far south. A restless but shy species which mostly sings from concealment inside bushes. It hops on the ground when foraging. As with some other scrub robin species, the tail is regularly flicked and fanned, and the wings may be drooped. The alarm is a sharp skirr or skee-ip note. The loud and variable song may include countless, sometimes identical repetitions. The songs of the respective subspecies are believed to be distinguishable, and those of the 'white-winged' group are considered to be shriller. It feeds on insects, especially termites and ants.

=== Breeding ===
Pairs are monogamous and nest solitarily from early to midsummer. The nest is built from dry grass by the female only, and is placed some 10 to 20 cm up at the heart of a grass tuft. Usually three eggs are laid and these are incubated by the female only. The cream-coloured eggs, measuring 20 x 14 mm, are blotched with brown and purple around the thicker end. The chicks are reared by both parents. Some nests are parasitised by cuckoos.
