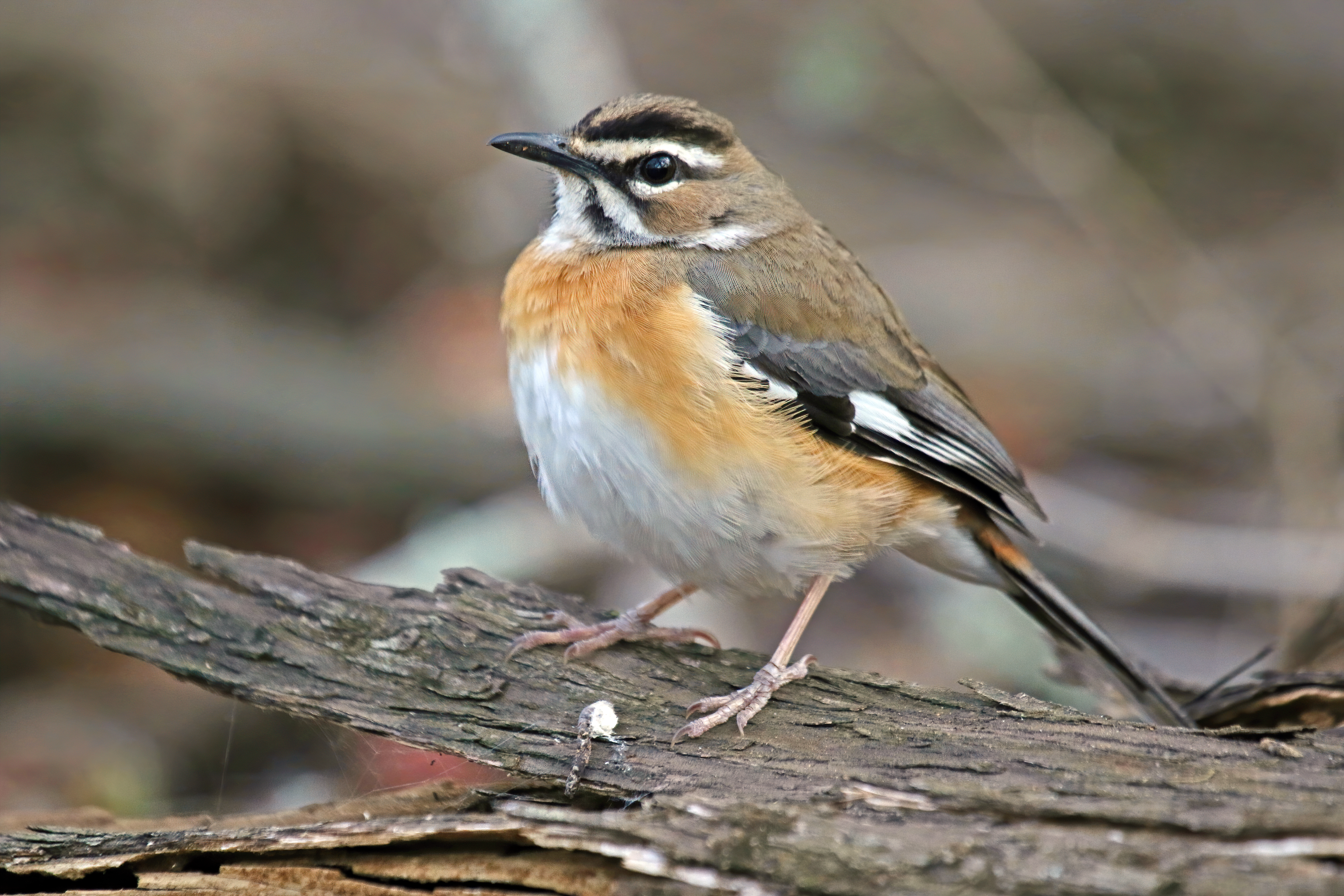
- Bearded scrub robin (Tychaedon quadrivirgata)

Scientific classification
- Kingdom: Animalia
- Phylum: Chordata
- Class: Aves
- Order: Passeriformes
- Family: Muscicapidae
- Genus: Tychaedon; Richmond, 1917

Type species
- Cossypha signata Sundevall, 1850

= Tychaedon =

Genus of birds

Tychaedon is a genus of passerine birds in the Old World flycatcher family Muscicapidae that are found in Sub-Saharan Africa. It contains species that were formerly placed in the genus Cercotrichas.

== Taxonomy ==
The species now placed in this genus were previously placed in the genus Cercotrichas. A molecular phylogenetic study of the family Muscicapidae published in 2023 found that Cercotrichas was paraphyletic. In the rearrangement to create monophyletic genera, some species were moved to the resurrected genus Tychaedon. This genus had been erected in 1917 by the American ornithologist Charles Wallace Richmond as a replacement name for Aedonopsis that had been introduced by Richard Bowdler Sharpe 1883. The type species is Cossypha signata Sundevall, 1850, the brown scrub robin. The genus name Tychaedon combines Ancient Greek τυχη/tukhē meaning "chance" or "luck" with αηδων/aēdōn, αηδονος/aēdonos meaning "nightingale" or "songstress".

These are African species of open woodland or scrub, that nest in bushes or on the ground.

The genus contains the following five species:

Image	Common name	Scientific name	Distribution
	Karoo scrub robin	Tychaedon coryphoeus	southern Africa
	Brown scrub robin	Tychaedon signata	forests of eastern southern Africa
	Forest scrub robin	Tychaedon leucosticta	sparsely present throughout the African tropical rainforest
	Bearded scrub robin	Tychaedon quadrivirgata	East Africa
	Miombo scrub robin	Tychaedon barbata	miombo
