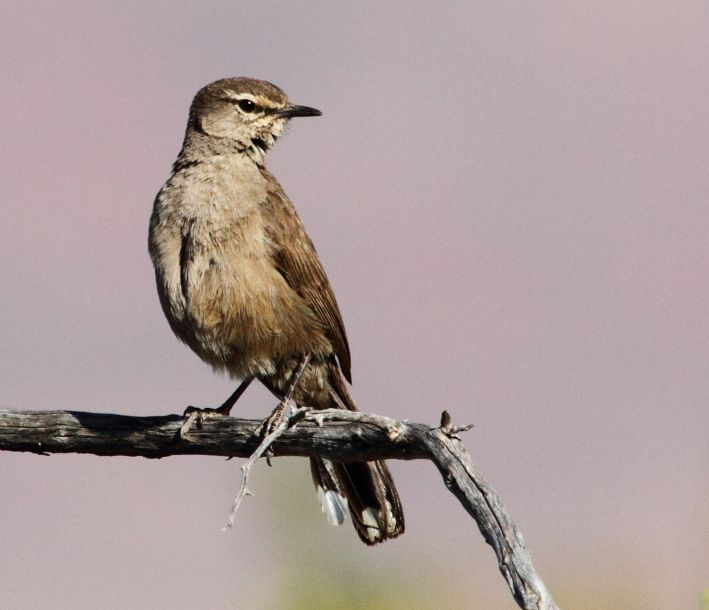
- In Namaqua N. P., South Africa

Conservation status
- Least Concern (IUCN 3.1)

Scientific classification
- Kingdom: Animalia
- Phylum: Chordata
- Class: Aves
- Order: Passeriformes
- Family: Muscicapidae
- Genus: Tychaedon
- Species: T. coryphoeus

Binomial name
- Tychaedon coryphoeus (Vieillot, 1817)

Synonyms
- Erythropygia coryphoeus Cercotrichas coryphoeus

= Karoo scrub robin =

Species of bird

The Karoo scrub robin (Tychaedon coryphoeus) or Karoo robin is a species of bird in the family Muscicapidae. It is found in Lesotho, Namibia, and South Africa. Its natural habitats are dry shrubland and Mediterranean-type shrubby vegetation. This species was formerly placed in the genus Cercotrichas.

== Description ==
It is 17 cm long and weighs 19 g. The upperparts are drab greyish brown; the face with a narrow, white supercilium above thin black eye-stripe. Partial whitish eye-ring below eye. Closed tail darker than rump and mantle. Upper wing coverts and flight feathers brown, underwing dull buffy brown. Bill black, eyes brown and legs as well as feet black.

Song calls vary between individuals, e.g. chip, swee-chipswirraree, seeep-seeep-treeeeyer, repeated 5 – 10 times.

== Habitat ==
Favours bare ground beneath ca. 1 m high vegetation and can be found in the low shrublands of the Karoo and Namaqualand in South Africa, in drainage line woodland. Also occasionally seen among tall vegetation at the base of farm dam walls.

== Foraging and food ==
Nearly all food taken on ground, while its diet consists mainly of insects, dominated by worker ants that it gleans from the ground surface, and also including termites, beetles, caterpillars, moths and small grasshoppers.

== Breeding ==
Monogamous, generally solitary nester with pairs remaining on defended territory from year to year. The nests are open, often deep cups sunk into variably sized platforms or large twigs and lined with fine, dry grass, leaf fragments and moss. Between 2 and 4 oval eggs of aquamarine or turquoise colour with brown spots and blotches.

== Races ==
Its populations are genetically highly structured. Three races are accepted.

- T. c. coryphoeus (Vieillot, 1817)

Habitat and range: Nama and Succulent Karoo, strandveld and thicket in arid savanna of western Lesotho, the southern Free State, Northern, Western and Eastern Cape, South Africa
Description: dark brown plumage

- T. c. abboti (Friedmann, 1932)

Habitat and range: Desert and Karoo of southern Namibia and Northern Cape, South Africa
Description: more buffy (rather than rufous) on vent and undertail plumage than nominate

- T. c. cinerea (Macdonald, 1952)

Habitat and range: Strandveld and Succulent Karoo on sandy substrates along South Africa's western seafront
Description: greyish brown plumage below and paler above than nominate
