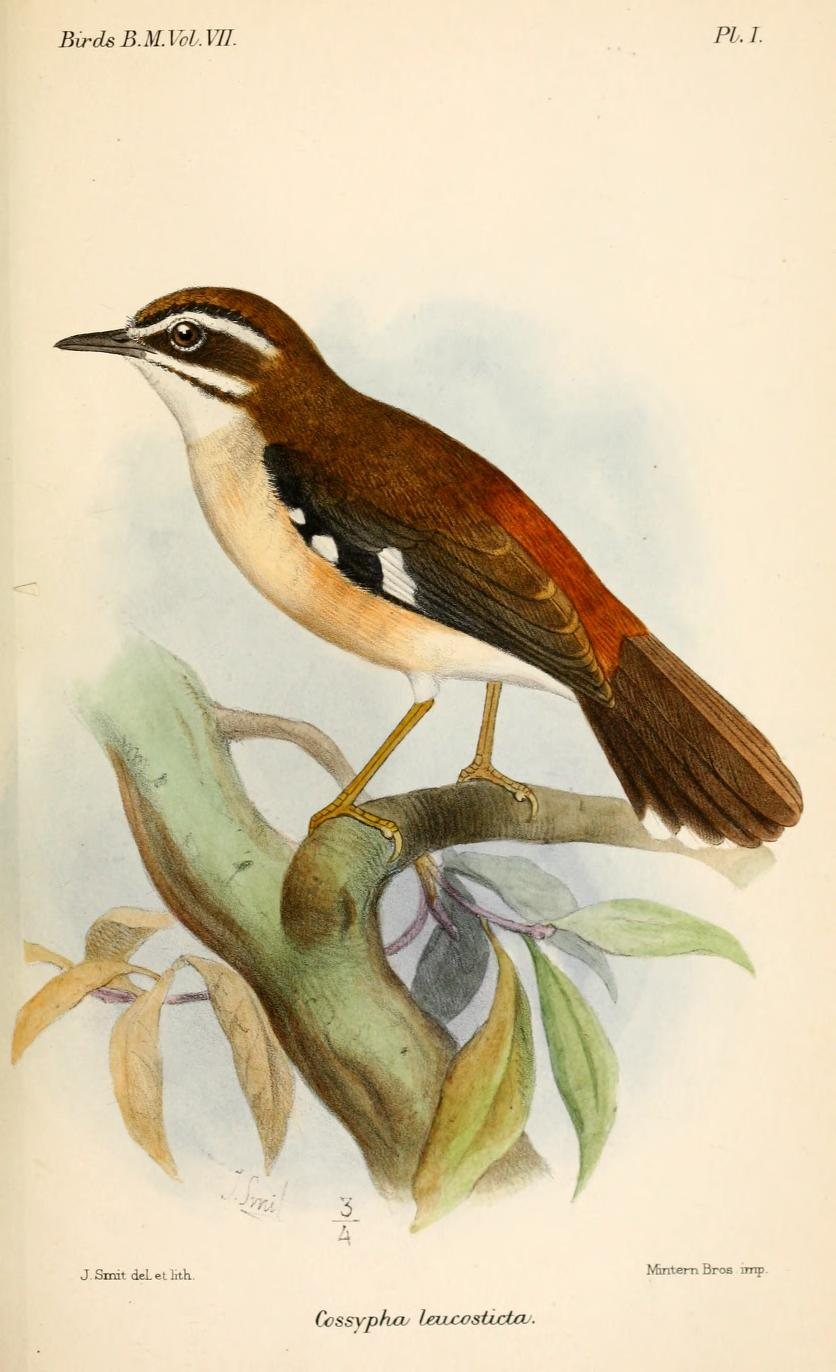
- Illustration by Joseph Smit, 1883

Conservation status
- Least Concern (IUCN 3.1)

Scientific classification
- Kingdom: Animalia
- Phylum: Chordata
- Class: Aves
- Order: Passeriformes
- Family: Muscicapidae
- Genus: Tychaedon
- Species: T. leucosticta

Binomial name
- Tychaedon leucosticta (Sharpe, 1883)

Synonyms
- Erythropygia leucosticta Cossypha leucosticta Cercotrichas leucosticta

= Forest scrub robin =

Species of bird

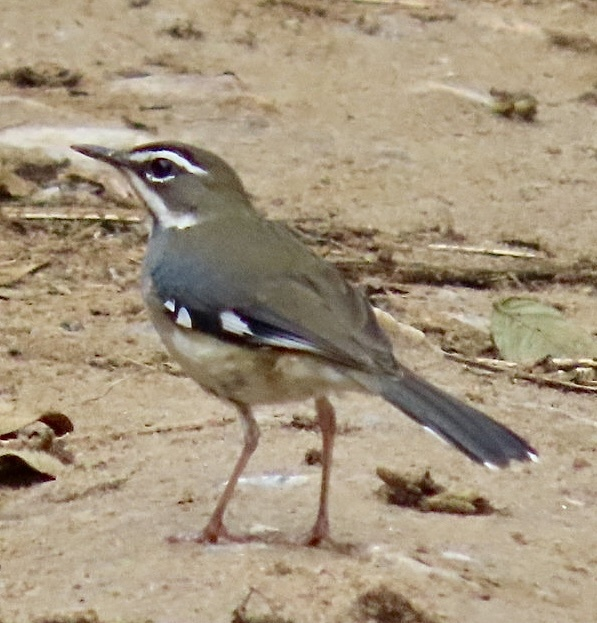
Live bird in Angola

The forest scrub robin (Tychaedon leucosticta) is a species of bird in the family Muscicapidae. It is disjunctly present throughout the African tropical rainforest. This species was formerly placed in the genus Cercotrichas.

Four subspecies are recognised:

- T. l. colstoni (Tye, 1991) – Sierra Leone, Liberia and Ivory Coast
- T. l. leucosticta (Sharpe, 1883) – Ghana
- T. l. collsi (Alexander, 1907) – southeast Central African Republic, northeast DR Congo and west Uganda
- T. l. reichenowi (Hartert, EJO, 1907) – west Angola
