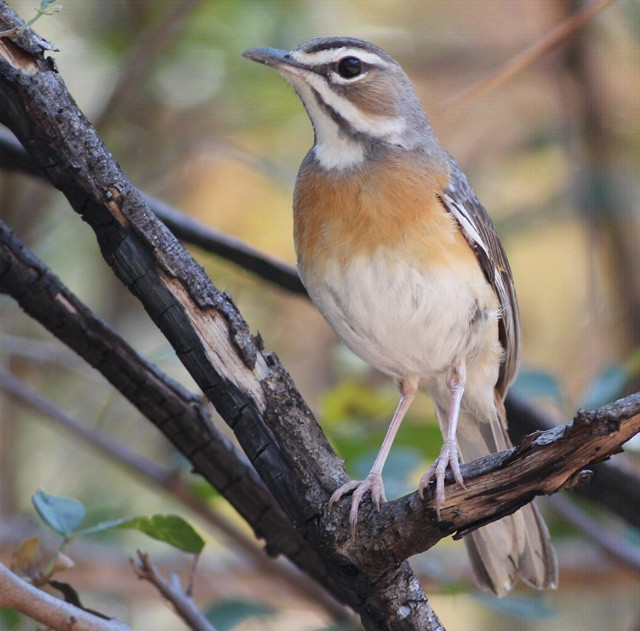

Conservation status
- Least Concern (IUCN 3.1)

Scientific classification
- Kingdom: Animalia
- Phylum: Chordata
- Class: Aves
- Order: Passeriformes
- Family: Muscicapidae
- Genus: Tychaedon
- Species: T. barbata

Binomial name
- Tychaedon barbata (Hartlaub & Finsch, 1870)

Synonyms
- Erythropygia barbata; Cercotrichas barbata

= Miombo scrub robin =

Species of bird

The miombo scrub robin (Tychaedon barbata) is a species of bird in the family Muscicapidae. It is found in Angola, Burundi, Democratic Republic of the Congo, Malawi, Mozambique, Tanzania, and Zambia. This species was formerly placed in the genus Cercotrichas.

Its natural habitat is subtropical or tropical dry forests.
