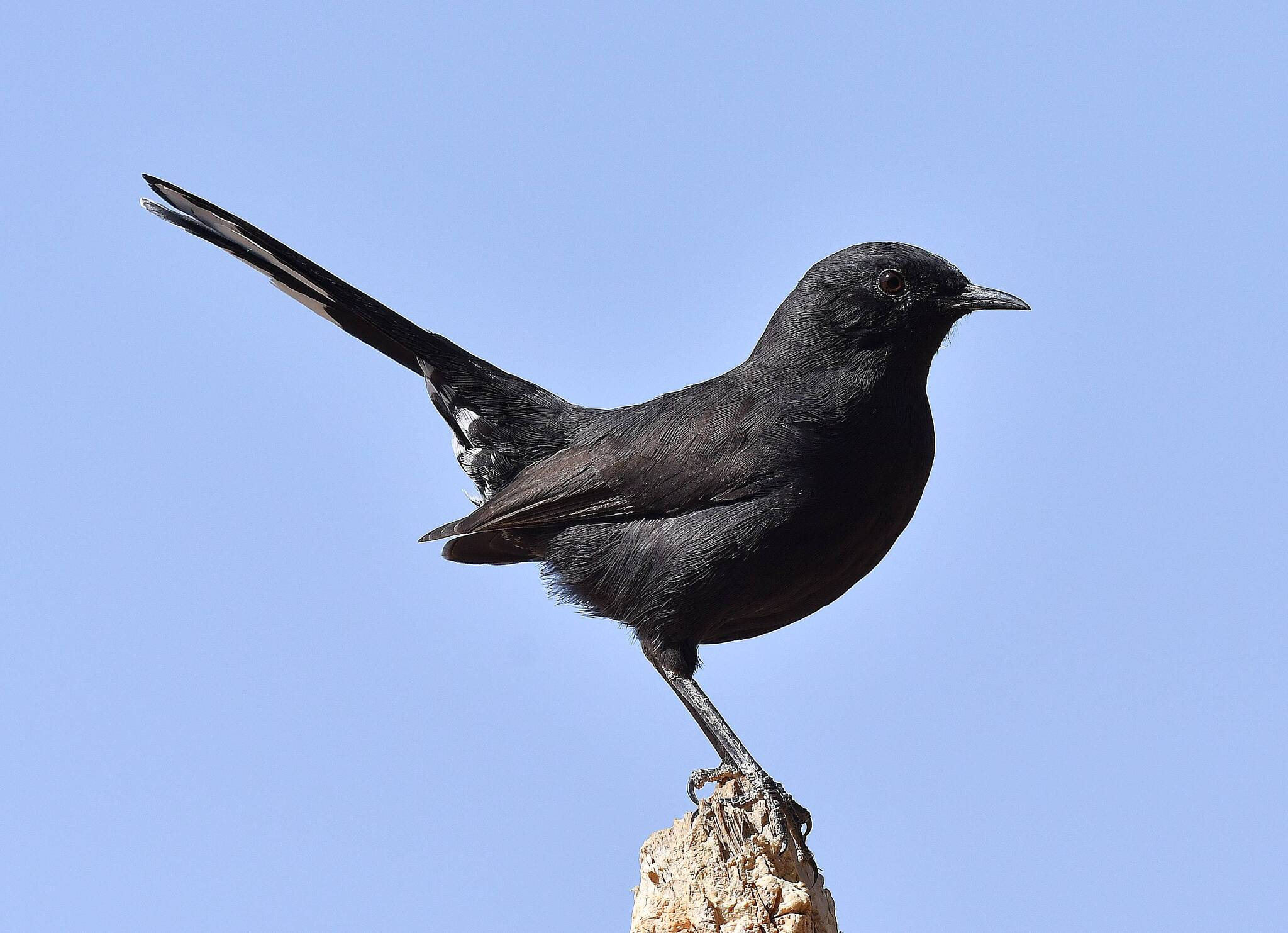
- Black scrub robin, Algeria

Conservation status
- Least Concern (IUCN 3.1)

Scientific classification
- Kingdom: Animalia
- Phylum: Chordata
- Class: Aves
- Order: Passeriformes
- Family: Muscicapidae
- Genus: Cercotrichas
- Species: C. podobe

Binomial name
- Cercotrichas podobe (Müller, 1776)

= Black scrub robin =

Species of bird

The black scrub robin (Cercotrichas podobe) is a species of bird in the family Muscicapidae. It is native to the Sahel and montane Arabian Peninsula. Its natural habitat is dry savanna.

== Gallery ==
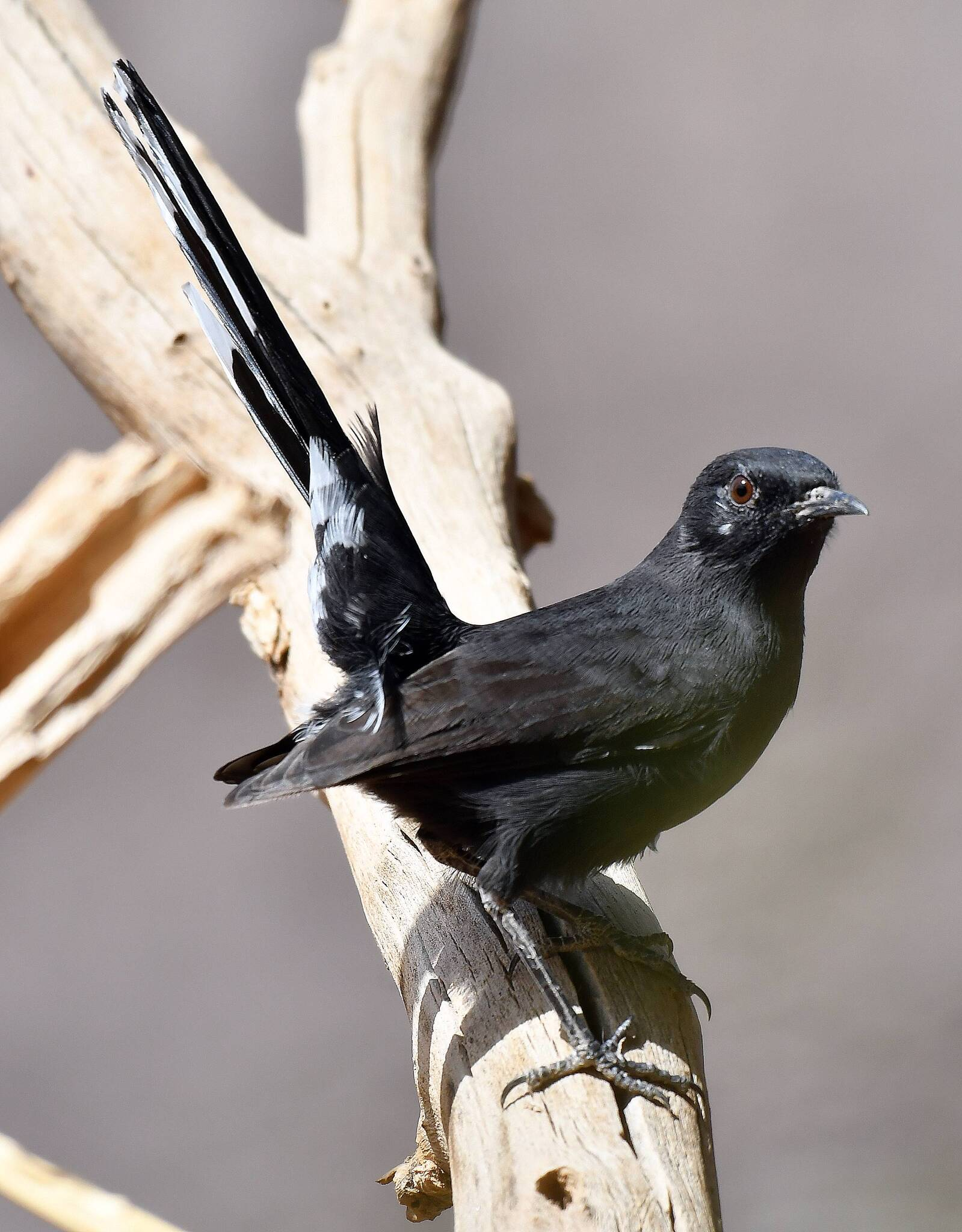

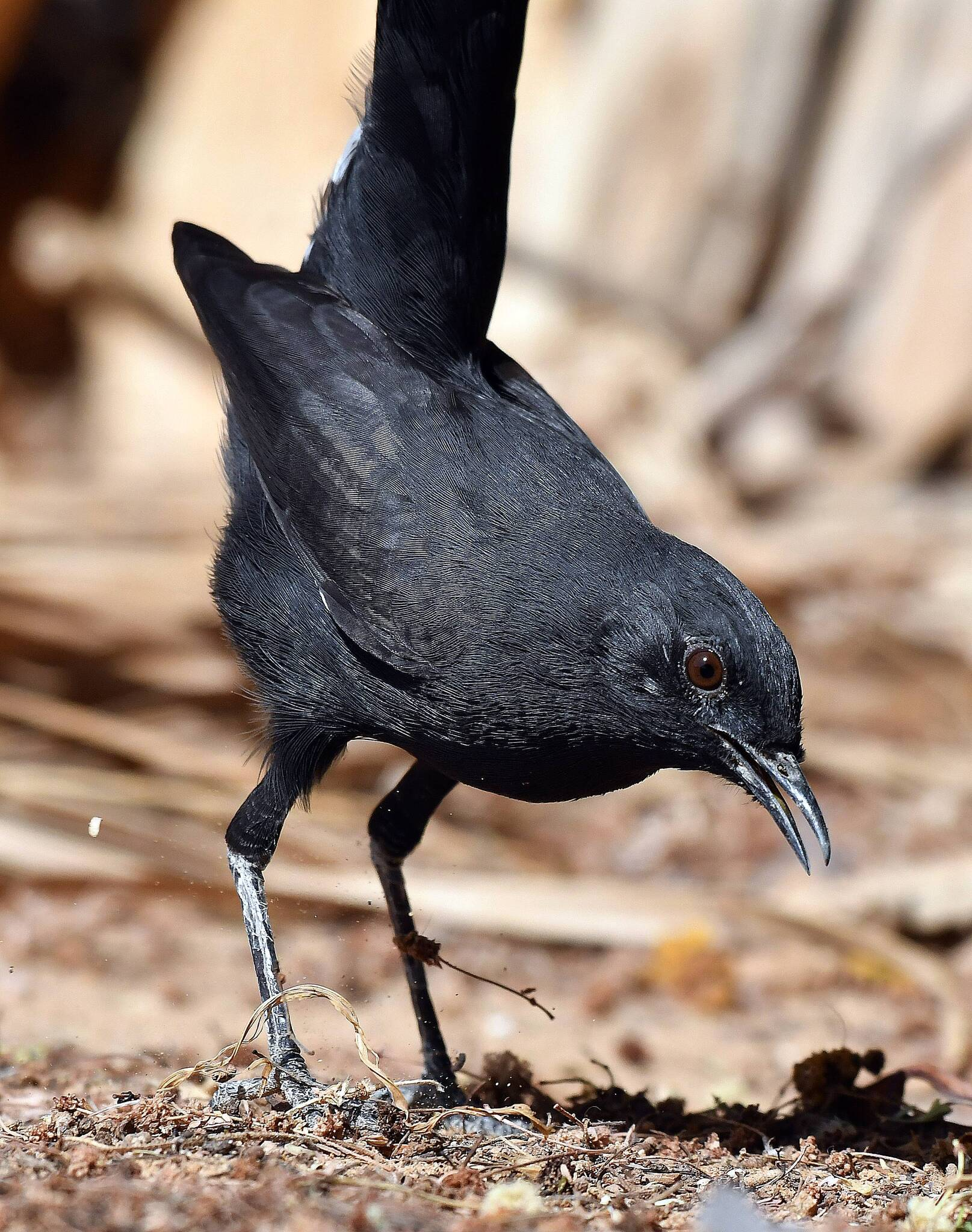

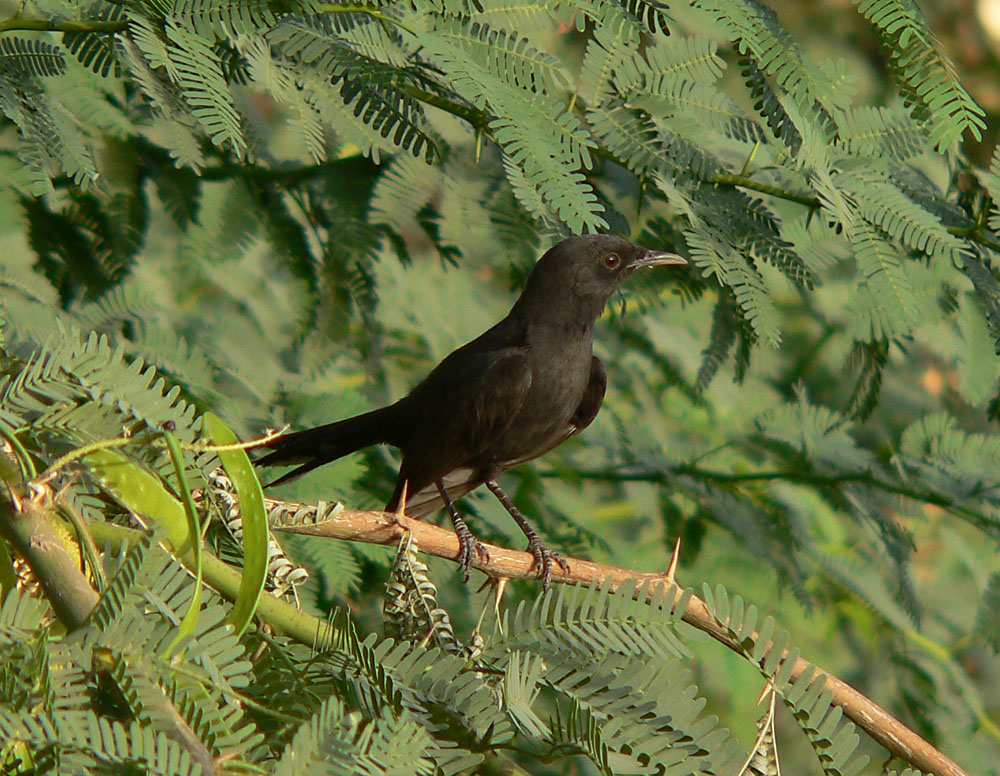
near Iférouane, Niger

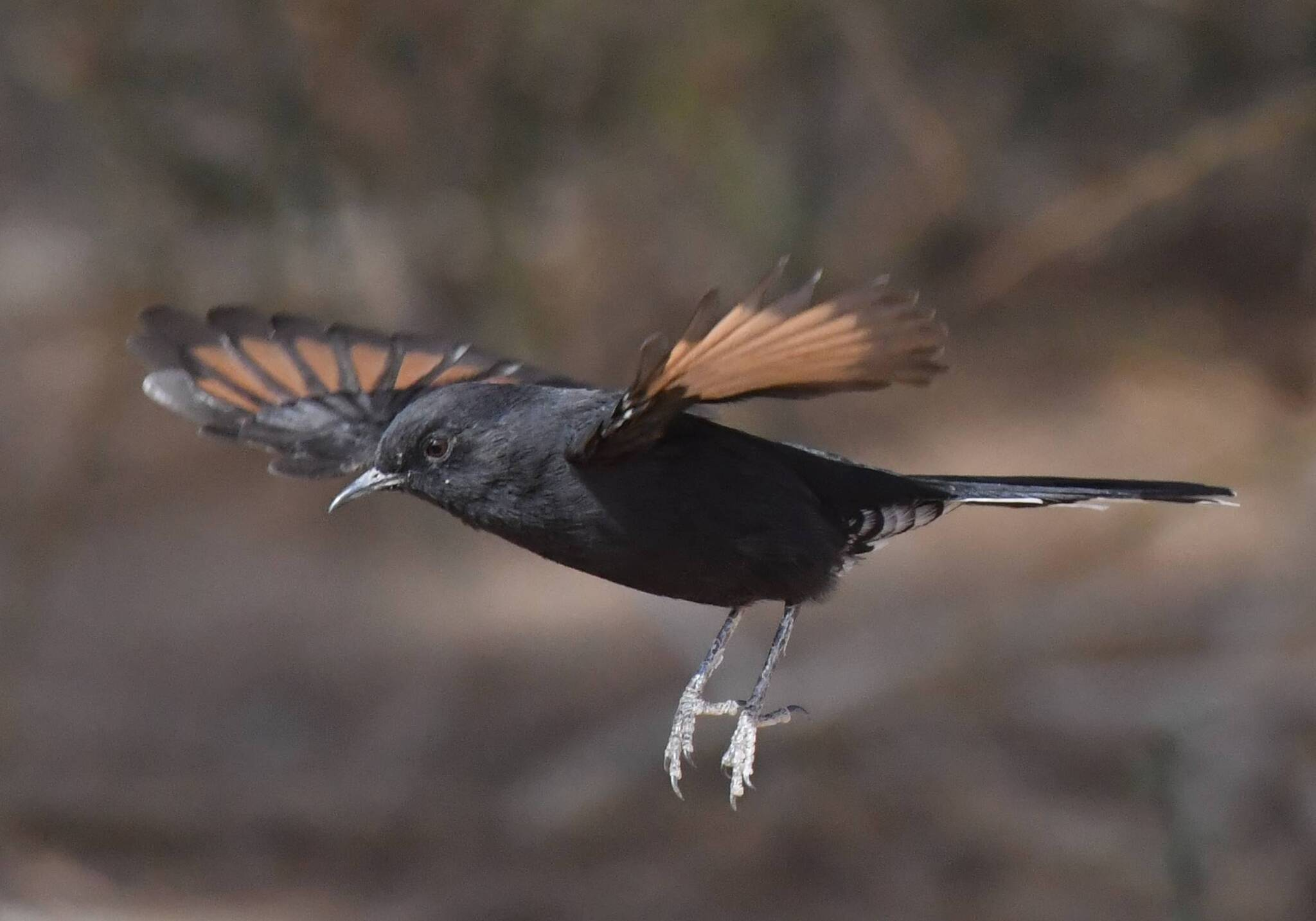

Riyadh, KSA 1992
