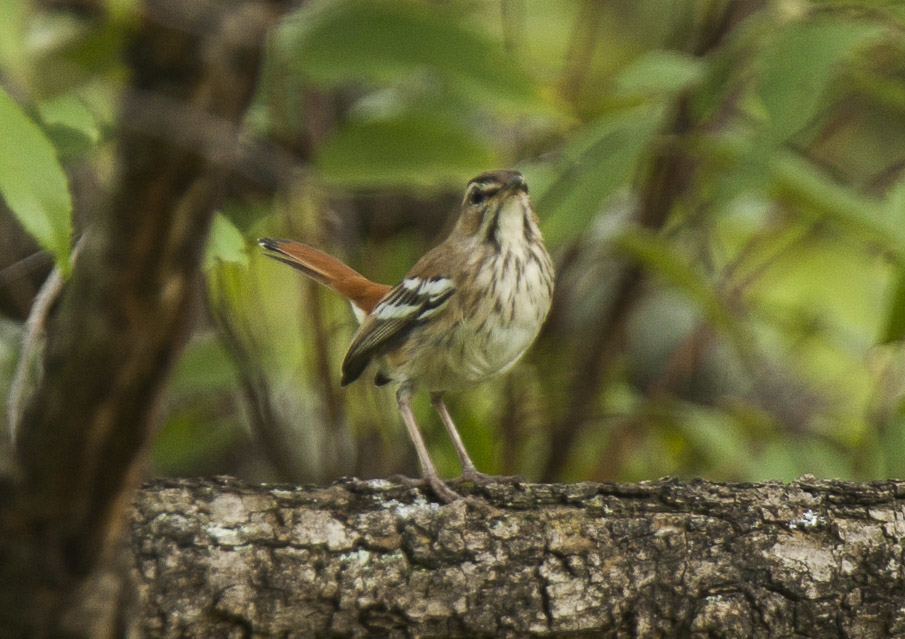

Conservation status
- Least Concern (IUCN 3.1)

Scientific classification
- Kingdom: Animalia
- Phylum: Chordata
- Class: Aves
- Order: Passeriformes
- Family: Muscicapidae
- Genus: Cercotrichas
- Species: C. hartlaubi

Binomial name
- Cercotrichas hartlaubi (Reichenow, 1891)

Synonyms
- Erythropygia hartlaubi

= Brown-backed scrub robin =

Species of bird

The brown-backed scrub robin (Cercotrichas hartlaubi) is a species of bird in the family Muscicapidae. It is found in Angola, Burundi, Cameroon, Central African Republic, Democratic Republic of the Congo, Kenya, Nigeria, Rwanda, Tanzania, and Uganda. Its natural habitat is moist savanna.
