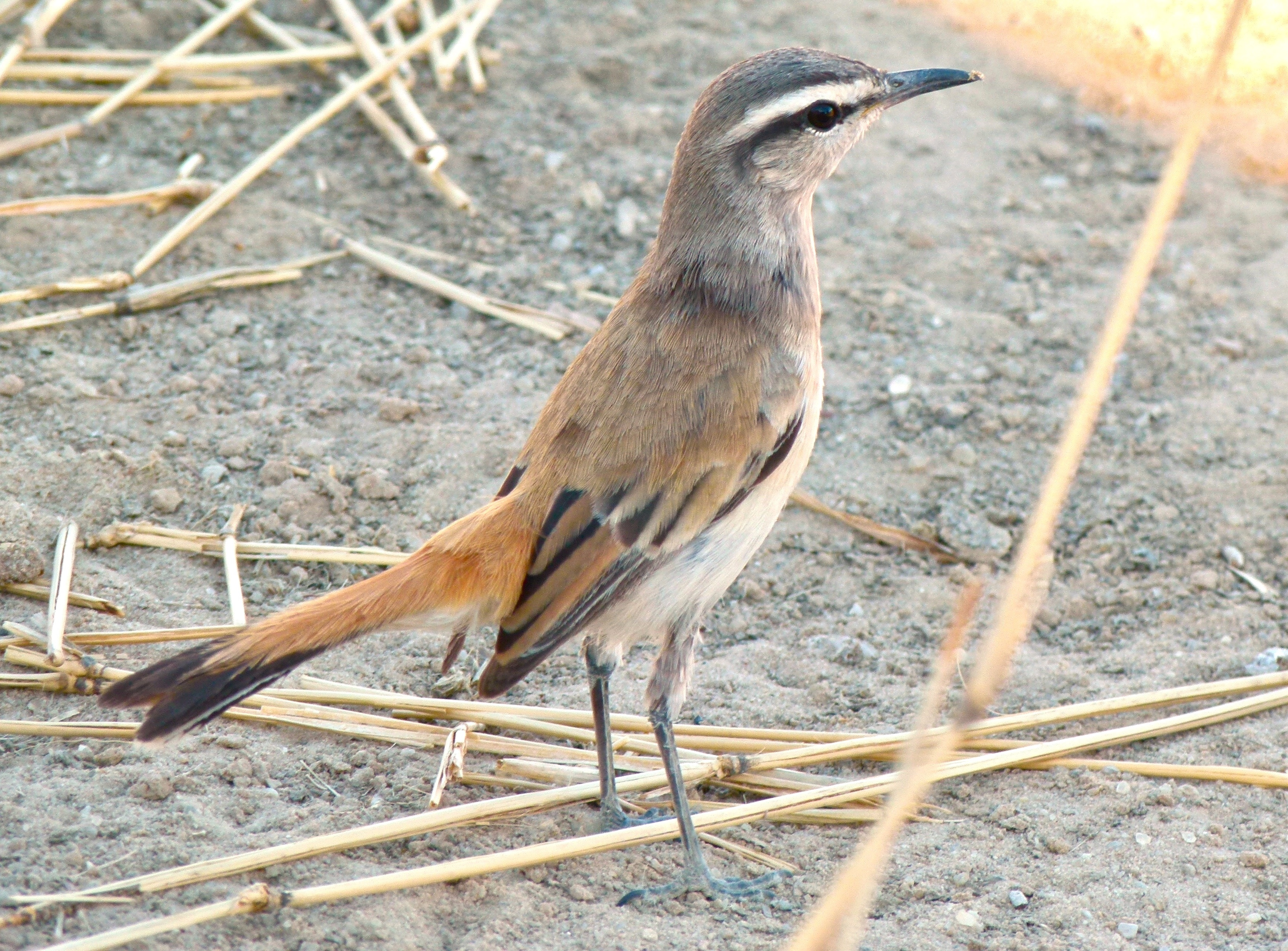
- Foraging on the ground, at Kgalagadi Transfrontier Park, Northern Cape

Conservation status
- Least Concern (IUCN 3.1)

Scientific classification
- Kingdom: Animalia
- Phylum: Chordata
- Class: Aves
- Order: Passeriformes
- Family: Muscicapidae
- Genus: Cercotrichas
- Species: C. paena

Binomial name
- Cercotrichas paena (Smith, 1836)

Synonyms
- Erythropygia paena

= Kalahari scrub robin =

Species of bird

The Kalahari scrub robin (Cercotrichas paena) is a species of bird in the family Muscicapidae. It is sometimes known as the sandy scrub robin.

== Range ==
It is found in southern Angola, Botswana, Namibia, northern South Africa, and Zimbabwe, where it occurs in sandveld with low trees and scrub, on the edges of woodland, and in savanna. It will also inhabit human-altered environments including old fields and gardens. The species is common and not considered threatened by human activities.

== Breeding ==
The Kalahari scrub robin is a seasonal breeder, with the season stretching from August to February, and peaking in November, also the peak of the wet season. The species is monogamous and territorial, with territory sizes varying from 0.7 - 4.3 ha. Females are responsible for constructing the nest, which are weaved of shrubs and grasses and placed in low thorny bushes. The nest building stage takes around 5 days. The average clutch size is about two, although clutch size is bigger later in the season. Only the female incubates the eggs, the male defends the nest, aggressively attacking intruders and warning when predators approach. The incubation lasts around 12 days. Having hatched the female removes the eggshells from the nests and drops them away from the nest to disguise the nest from potential predators. After hatching the female broods the chicks for a between 3–7 days. Both parents feed the chicks and remove the chick's faecal sacs. The chicks are altricial when they hatch, and take around 12 days to fledge.

== Gallery ==
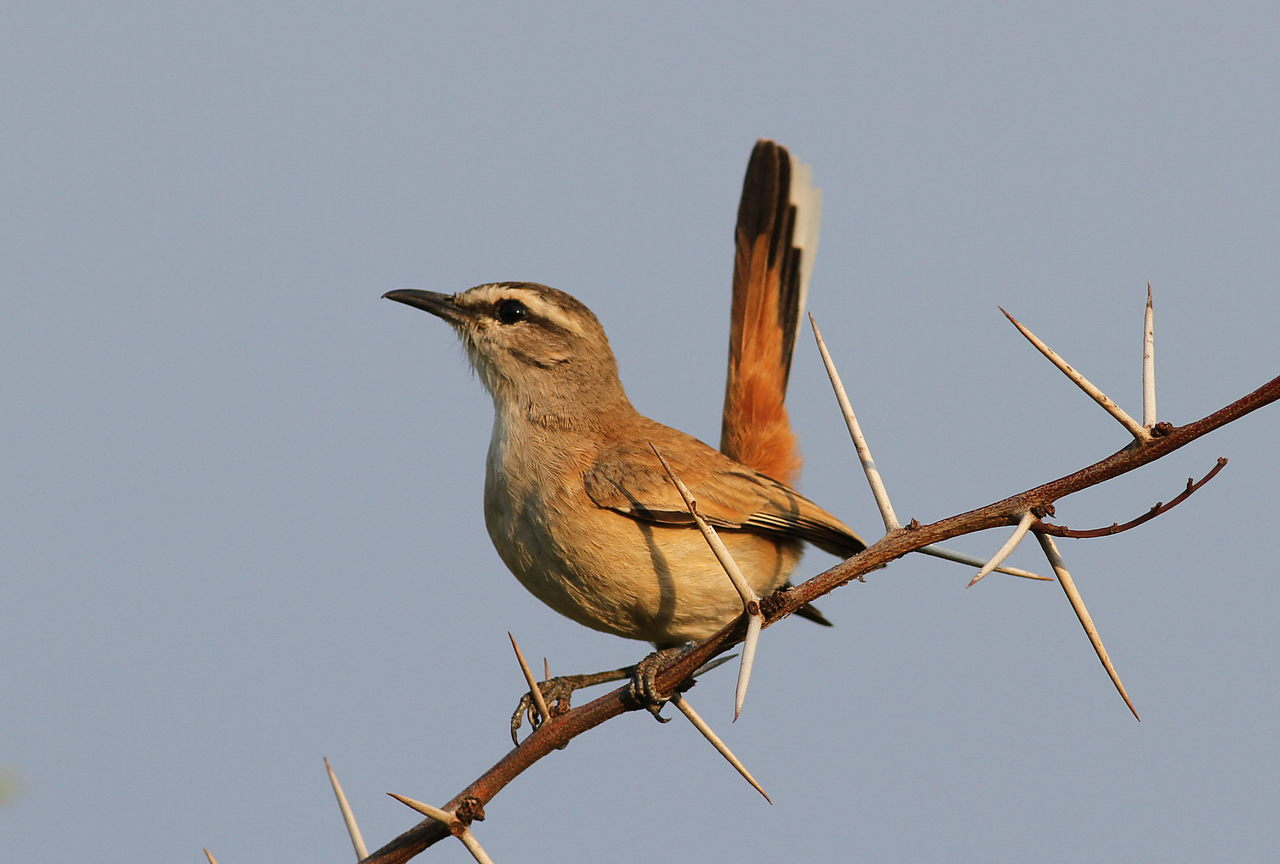
Cocking the tail

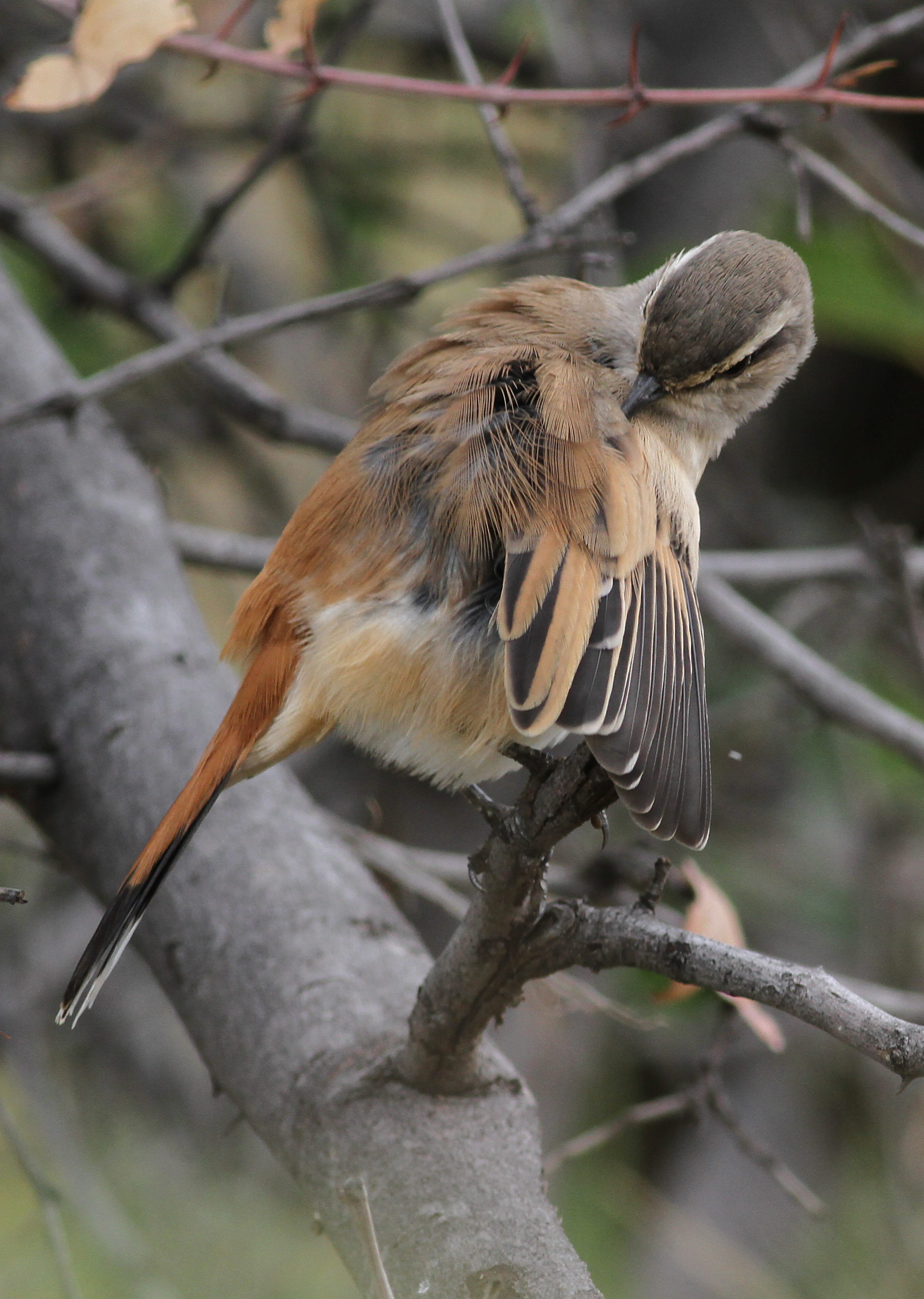
Preening

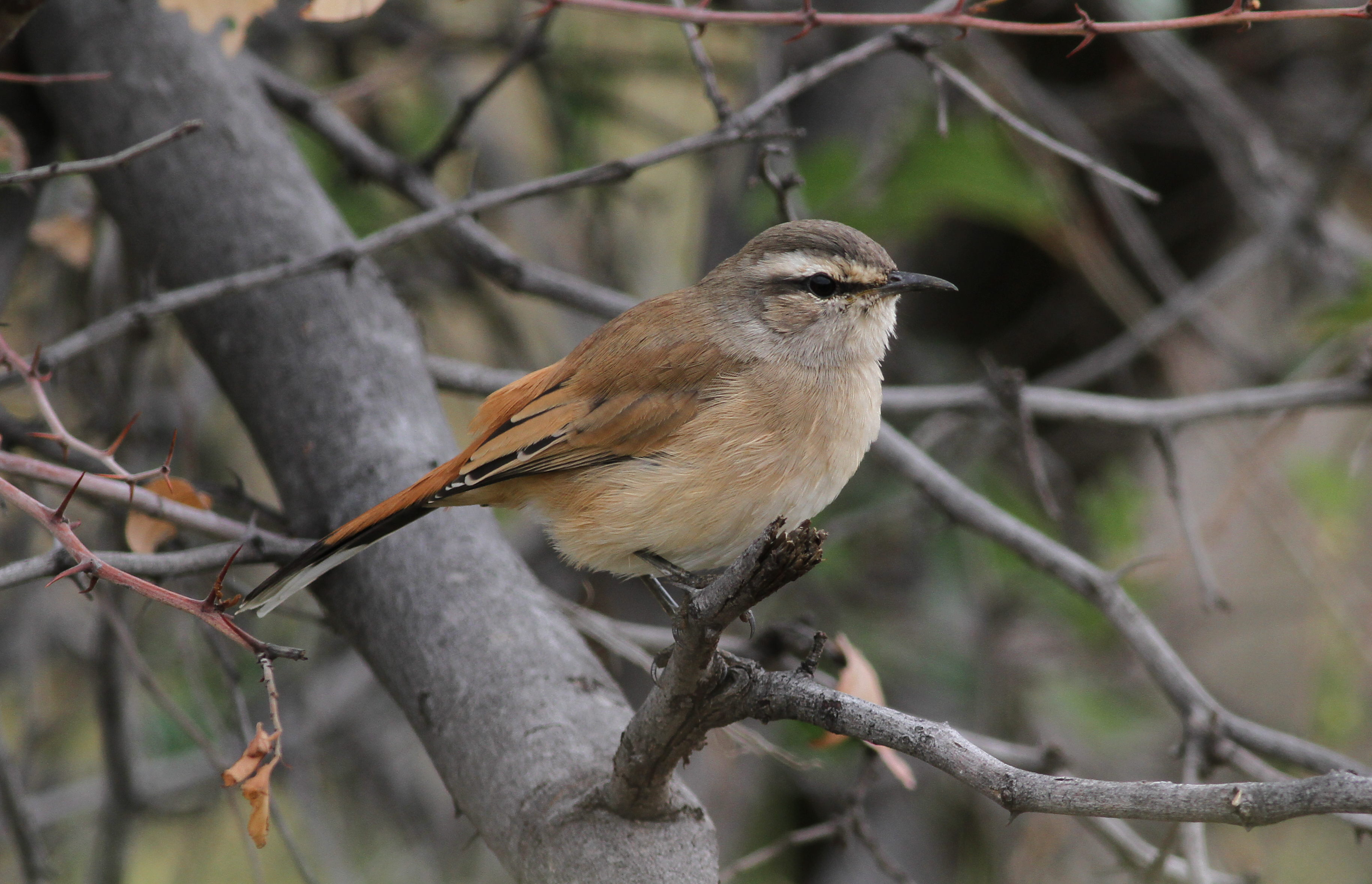
Perched in tree
