= Charles Wallace Richmond =

American ornithologist

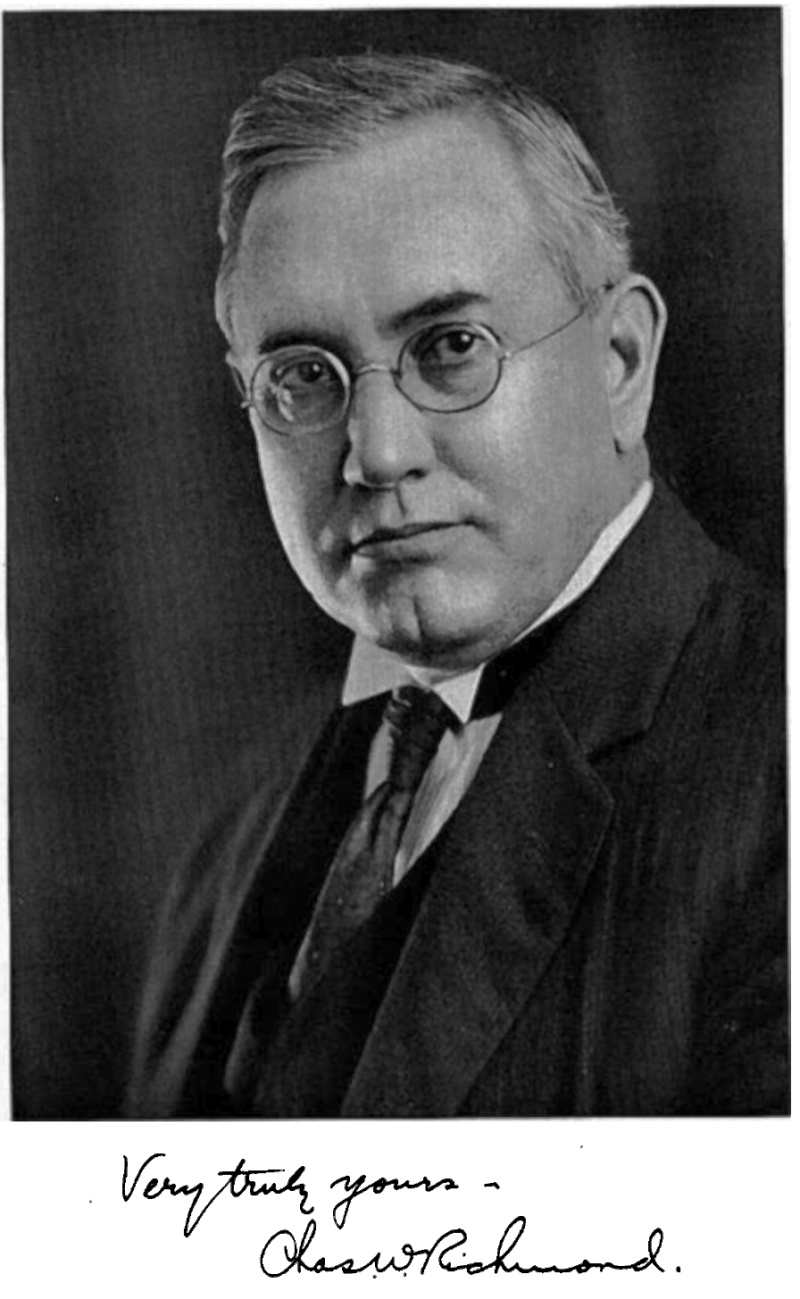
- Born: December 31, 1868; Kenosha, Wisconsin
- Died: May 19, 1932 (aged 63)
- Scientific career
- Fields: Ornithology
- Workplaces: United States National Museum
- Author abbrev. (zoology): Richmond

Charles Wallace Richmond (December 31, 1868 – May 19, 1932) was an American ornithologist. He is best remembered for a compilation of the Latin names of birds that is called the Richmond Index.

== Life and work ==
He was born in Kenosha, Wisconsin and was the eldest son of Edward Leslie and Josephine Ellen Richmond. His mother died when he was 12. His father who was a railway mail clerk moved to Washington, D.C., and joined the Government Printing House there. His father remarried and he had the additional duty of taking care of younger stepbrothers. During his early life he earned extra income for the family by leaving school and working as a page in the House of Representatives. At the age of 15 he got a position as a messenger in the Geological Survey. In 1897 he graduated after studied medicine in Georgetown University and in the next year he married Louise H. Seville.

While still at Wisconsin he had collected the eggs of a Kingbird and when he moved to Washington, in 1881. He visited the Smithsonian Institution museum and seeing the large collection of nests and eggs he decided that he would never produce such a collection himself and decided to hand over his own collections to the museum. This led him to meet Robert Ridgway. He subsequently met Ridgway often and this early influence was very strong. His work in the House of Representatives let him use the library there which had a good collection of books on birds.

In 1888, Richmond took part in a United States Geological Survey expedition to Montana. He became an ornithological clerk at the United States Department of Agriculture. After a collecting trip to Nicaragua he joined the staff of the United States National Museum in Washington, D.C., as a nightwatchman. He was promoted to Aid, followed by Assistant in the birds department. He became Associate Curator of Birds in 1894. Richmond then became Associate Curator in 1918. He moved up to Curator in 1929, but stepped back to stay as Associate Curator, so that Herbert Friedmann could become Curator.

== Research ==
Richmond started a card catalog when he was twenty one. He continued to maintain the catalog throughout his life. Research wise he focused on naming authorities for bird names, and was considered the foremost expert on the subject. His card catalog continues to be utilized by ornithologists, today.

== Legacy ==
The scientific name of the northern cardinal, Richmondena cardinalis, was named in his honor, as was the wrasse, Halichoeres richmondi.
