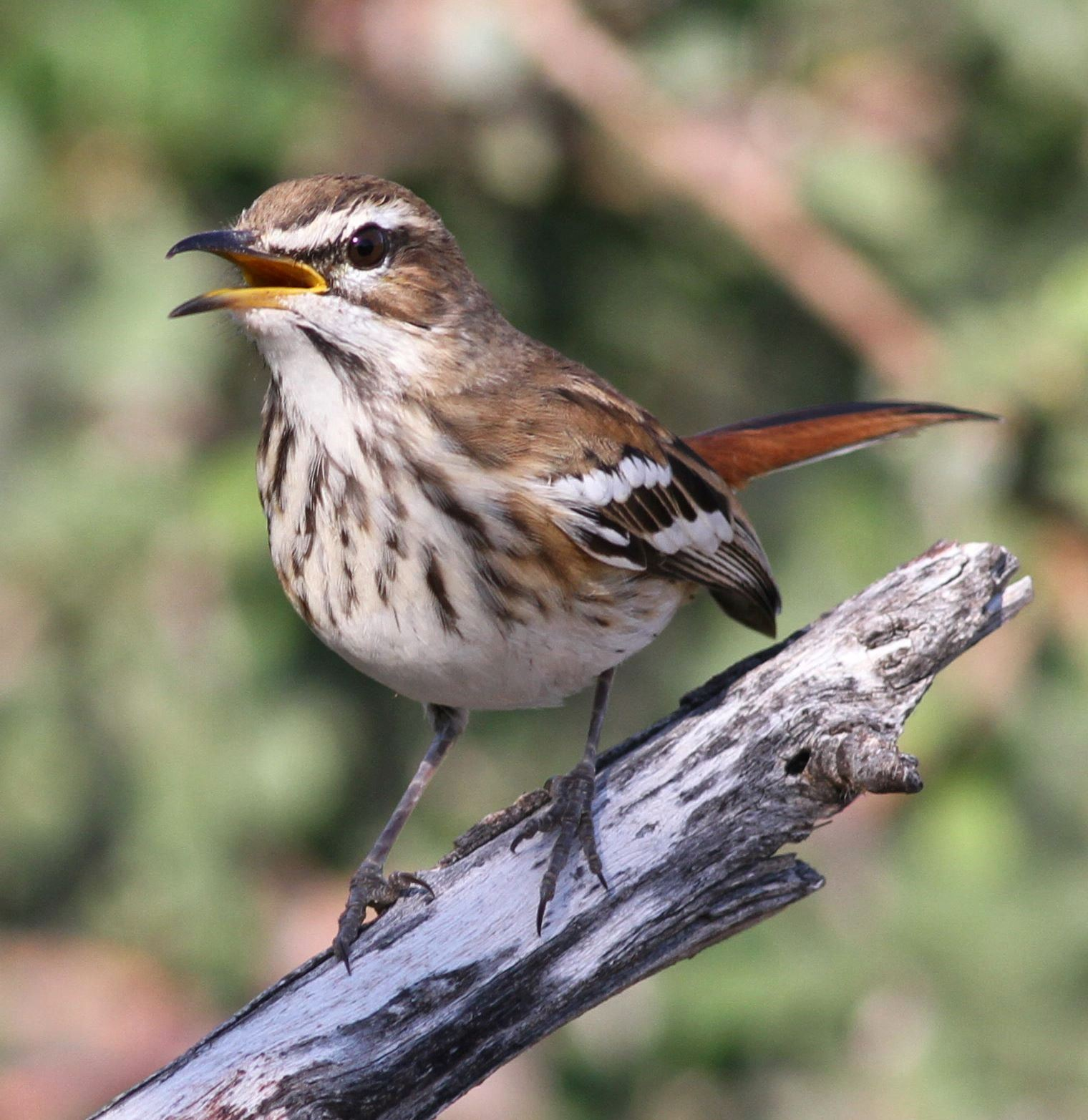
- White-browed scrub robin (Cercotrichas leucophrys)

Scientific classification
- Kingdom: Animalia
- Phylum: Chordata
- Class: Aves
- Order: Passeriformes
- Family: Muscicapidae
- Genus: Cercotrichas; F. Boie, 1831

Type species
- Turdus erythropterus Gmelin, 1788=Turdus podobe Müller, 1776

= Cercotrichas =

Genus of birds

Cercotrichas is a genus of medium-sized insectivorous birds. They were formerly considered to be in the thrush family, (Turdidae), but are more often now treated as part of the Old World flycatcher family, (Muscicapidae).

== Taxonomy ==
The genus Cercotrichas was introduced in 1831 by the German zoologist Friedrich Boie. The type species was subsequently designated as Turdus erythropterus Gmelin which is a junior synonym of Turdus podobe Müller, the black scrub robin. The genus name Cercotrichas is from Ancient Greek kerkos meaning "tail" and trikhas meaning "thrush".

This genus formerly included additional species. A molecular phylogenetic study of the Muscicapidae by Min Zhao and collaborators published in 2023 found that the genus Cercotrichas was paraphyletic. In the rearrangement to create monophyletic genera five species were moved to the resurrected genus Tychaedon that had been introduced in 1917 by the American ornithologist Charles Richmond.

Scrub robins are mainly African species of open woodland or scrub, which nest in bushes or on the ground, but the rufous-tailed scrub robin also breeds in southern Europe and east to Pakistan.

The genus contains the following five species:

Image	Common name	Scientific name	Distribution
	Kalahari scrub robin	Cercotrichas paena	Kalahari Desert to Kaokoveld
	Black scrub robin	Cercotrichas podobe	Sahel and montane Arabian Peninsula
	Rufous-tailed scrub robin	Cercotrichas galactotes	southwestern Palearctic, Central Asia, Sahel and Horn of Africa
	Brown-backed scrub robin	Cercotrichas hartlaubi	sparsely present across central Africa
	White-browed scrub robin	Cercotrichas leucophrys	Sub-Saharan Africa (rare in southern Africa and African tropical rainforest)
