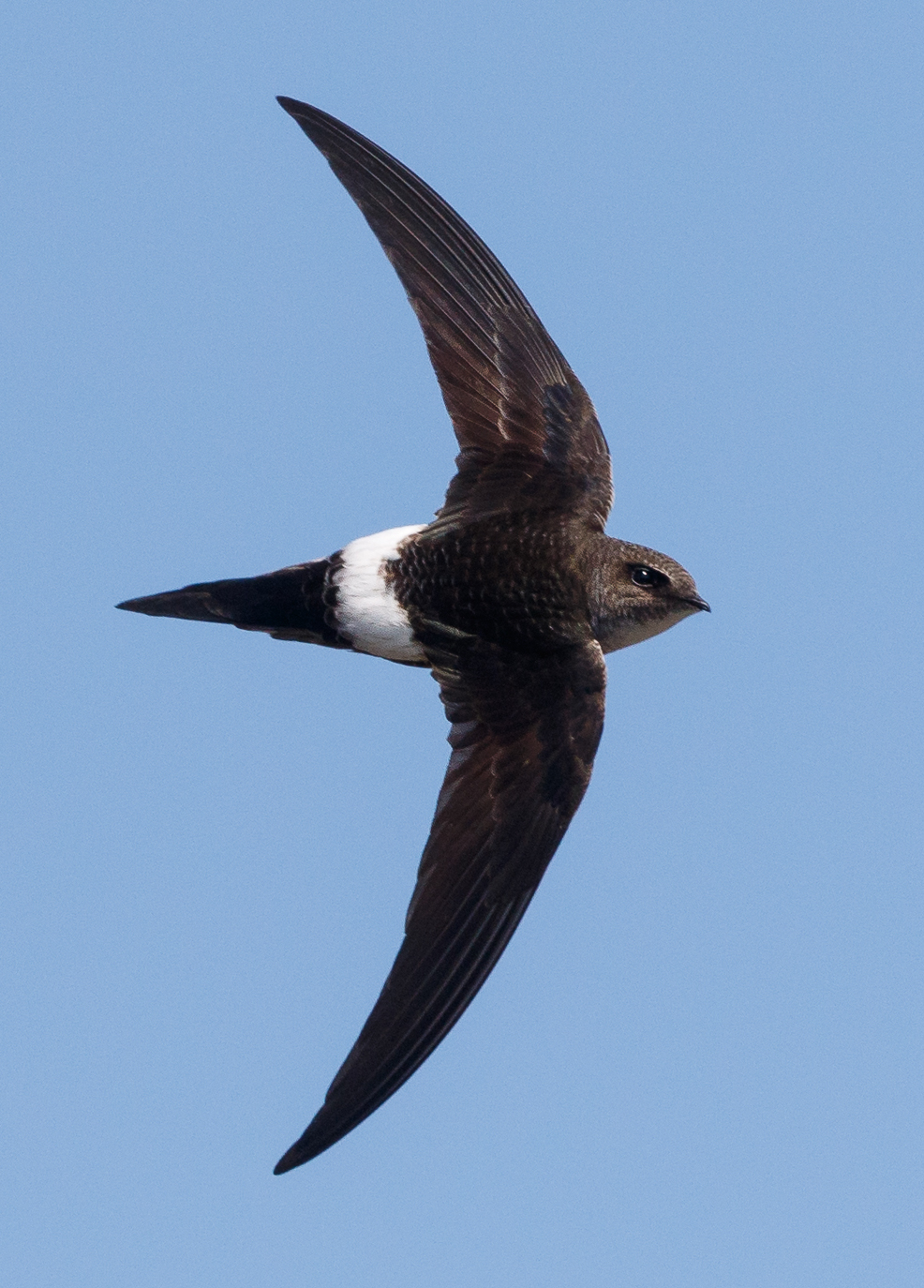

Conservation status
- Least Concern (IUCN 3.1)

Scientific classification
- Kingdom: Animalia
- Phylum: Chordata
- Class: Aves
- Order: Apodiformes
- Family: Apodidae
- Genus: Apus
- Species: A. pacificus

Binomial name
- Apus pacificus (Latham, 1801)
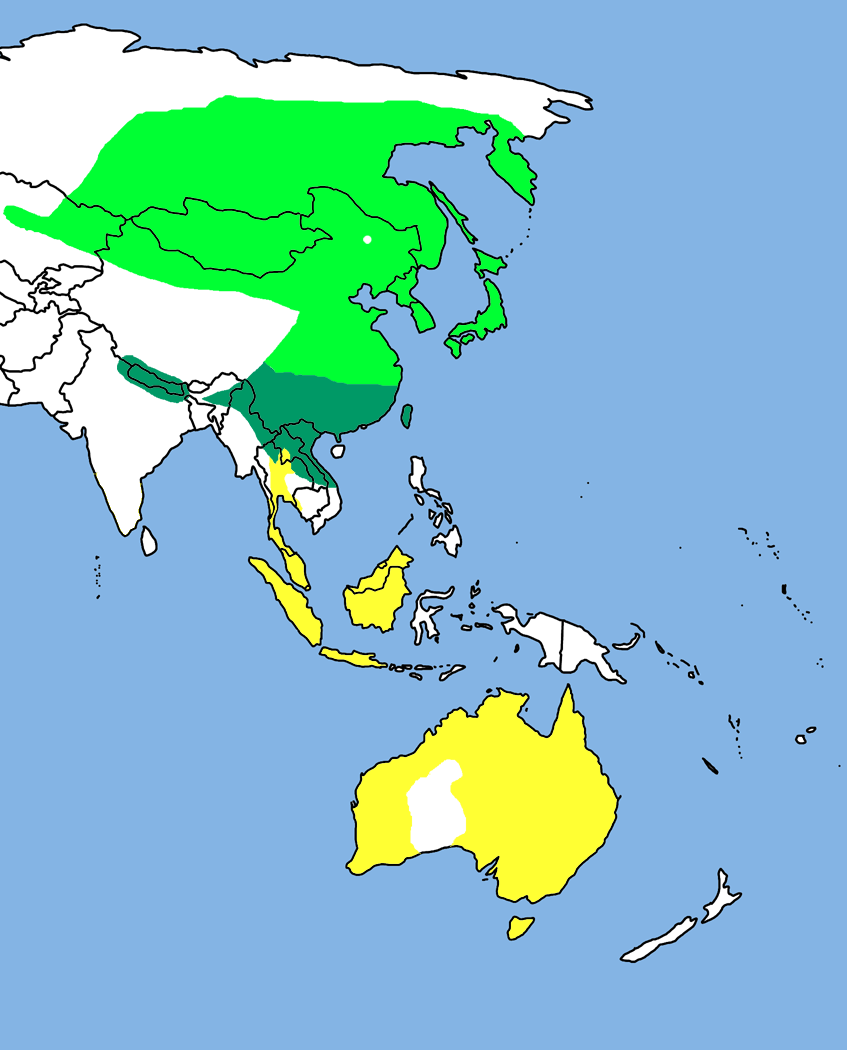
- Breeding range Breeding range of three former subspecies Non-breeding (ranges are approximate)

= Pacific swift =

Species of bird which breeds in eastern Asia

The Pacific swift (Apus pacificus) is a species of bird that is part of the Swift family. It breeds in eastern Asia. It is strongly migratory, spending the northern hemisphere's winter in Southeast Asia and Australia. The general shape and blackish plumage recall its relative, the common swift, from which it is distinguished by a white rump band and heavily marked underparts. The sexes are identical in appearance, although young birds can be identified by pale fringes to the wing feathers that are absent in adults. This swift's main call is a screech typical of its family. It is one of a group of closely related Asian swifts formerly regarded as one species.

The Pacific swift is found in a wide range of climatic zones and habitats. It breeds in sheltered locations such as caves, natural rock crevices or under the roofs of houses. The nest is a half-cup of dry grass and other fine material that is gathered in flight, cemented with saliva and attached to a vertical surface. The two or three white eggs are incubated for about seventeen days to hatching. Subsequently, the chicks have a long but variable period in the nest before they are fully fledged. When the parents cannot find sufficient food in bad weather, the young can survive for days without being fed by metabolising body fat.

Like all members of its family, the Pacific swift feeds exclusively on insects caught in flight. It tends to hunt higher than most of its relatives other than the white-throated needletail. The Pacific swift has a large population and extensive breeding area, and faces few threats from predators or human activities. It is classed as being of least concern by the International Union for Conservation of Nature. It has occurred as far afield as the US and New Zealand, and it is a very rare vagrant in Europe.

== Taxonomy ==
A 2011 study proposed the following treatment. The long-tailed birds from the Tibetan Plateau with a narrow white throat patch are separated as Salim Ali's swift, A. salimali, the small swifts with narrow white rumps from the Himalayas of India, Nepal and Bhutan become Blyth's swift, A. leuconyx, and the population that breeds in limestone caves in northern Southeast Asia, characterised by a green iridescence and shallow tail fork, is split as Cook's swift, A. cooki. The remaining subspecies are the nominate A. p. pacificus and the southern race A. p. kanoi (formerly known as kurodae). (Note: Leader found that kurodae, formerly treated as a synonym of pacificus, was distinguishable from that form but not from kanoi. Kurodae is the older name, and takes priority. The Clements Checklist of Birds of the World now also uses Apus pacificus kurodae.) This arrangement has been accepted by the International Ornithological Committee (IOC), but not the International Union for Conservation of Nature. A 2012 paper showed that cooki is closely related to the dark-rumped swift, A. acuticauda, which should therefore be included in the pacificus clade, but made no further taxonomic recommendations.

This swift was first described by John Latham in 1801 as Hirundo pacifica. Scopoli separated the swifts from the swallows as the genus Apus in 1777. Apus, like Apodidae, is derived from the Greek απους, apous, meaning "without feet", a reference to the small, weak legs of these most aerial of birds, and pacificus refers to the Pacific Ocean.

== Description ==
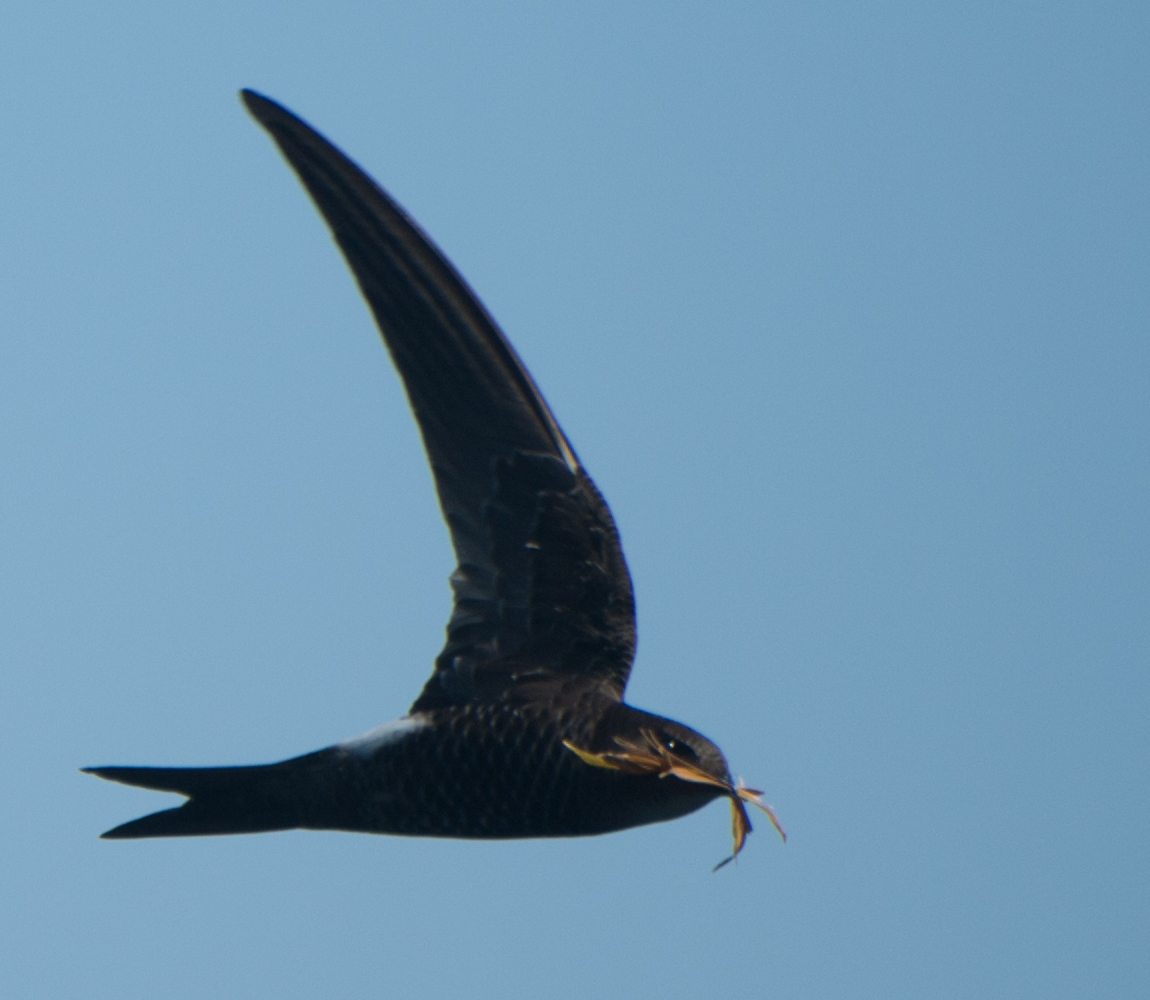
Flying with nesting material in its beak in Japan

At 17–18 cm (6.7–7.1 in) in length, the Pacific swift is the largest of the Apus swifts. It has a 43-to-54-cm (17-to-21-in) wingspan. Females are slightly heavier than males, averaging 44.5 g (1.57 oz) against 42.5 g (1.50 oz). It is similar in general shape to the common swift, although slightly longer-winged and with a more protruding head. The fork of the tail is deeper, and the rump is broader. The upperparts are black, apart from a white rump band and a somewhat greyer head. The underparts are black, although white fringes to the feathers give the belly a scaly appearance when seen well from below. The tail and the upper wings are black, and the underwings are brown. The eyes are brown and the small bill and very short legs are black. The sexes are identically plumaged, and juveniles differ from the adults only in that the feathers show pale fringes, particularly on the wings. The southern subspecies, A. p. kurodae, has a narrower white rump (15 mm/0.6 in against the nominate form's 20 mm/0.8 in), a grey throat and blacker underparts. Juveniles of migratory Apus swifts have a partial moult prior to migration, but retain the larger wing feathers. The moult is completed in the wintering grounds, where adults have a complete moult.

This species is usually straightforward to identify. The white-rumped swift is similar to Pacific swift, but its slender body and long, deeply forked tail make it appear quite different from its more powerfully built relative. A possible pitfall is a partially leucistic common swift with a white rump. The Pacific swift can be distinguished with care by its deeper tail fork, longer wings, bigger head, larger white throat patch and patterned underparts. In parts of Southeast Asia, migrating Pacific swifts pass through the resident ranges of former subspecies, and good views are then necessary to be sure of correct identification.

=== Voice ===
The calls given by flocks near the breeding areas are typical swift screams, including a trilled tsiririri or harsher spee-eer. They resemble the cries of the common swift, but are softer and less wheezy. Pacific swifts are less vocal on the wintering grounds, but produce a variety of twitters and buzzes.

== Distribution and habitat ==
The nominate subspecies, A. p. pacificus, breeds in eastern Asia from the Ob River northeast to Kamchatka and east to the Kuril Islands, Sakhalin and Japan. It is strongly migratory, wintering in southern Indonesia, Melanesia and Australia, including Tasmania. It is a common migrant through coastal Malaysia, Sumatra and Java with "vast numbers" crossing the Strait of Malacca. Subspecies A. p. kurodae breeds from southeastern Tibet through eastern China to southern Japan, Taiwan and Orchid Island. It is a relatively short-distance migrant, wintering in the Philippines, Malaysia and northern Indonesia.

As a powerful long-distance migrant, the nominate subspecies of Pacific swift has occurred as a vagrant far from its normal range. Birds have been recorded from Brunei, the Maldives, New Zealand and Macquarie Island, and there have been multiple occurrences in the Seychelles. In the US, this species is casual in the Pribilof and Aleutian Islands; a claimed 2010 sighting from the Yukon will be the first for Canada and the mainland of North America if ratified. In South America, there is a 1959 record from Colombia. There are 13 European records as of 2013, from Denmark (two), Spain, Sweden (four) and the UK (seven). It is possible that this overstates the true number of visiting birds. All the listed countries had a sighting on different dates in the summer of 2013 which could be due to a single wandering bird. The four most recent English records in 2005, 2008, 2011 and 2013 all included sightings at Spurn, East Yorkshire, and may refer to one returning individual.

A mainly aerial species, this swift is not limited to particular land habitats or climatic zones; it breeds from the Arctic to sub-tropical China, and from sea level to at least 3,000 m (9,800 ft) in Japan. It is often found around human habitation. It tends to winter in lowlands, and in Australia it is found in arid areas as well as in towns and on the coast. Flocks of thousands may appear when there are hot strong winds. Pacific swifts often travel and feed with white-throated needletails. The Pacific swift probably sleeps in flight when not nesting, behaviour known to occur in the common swift and suspected in other Apus species, but there is an Australian record of these swifts roosting in a tree, and they are occasionally seen to land briefly on the ground or on vertical surfaces.

== Behaviour ==
=== Breeding ===
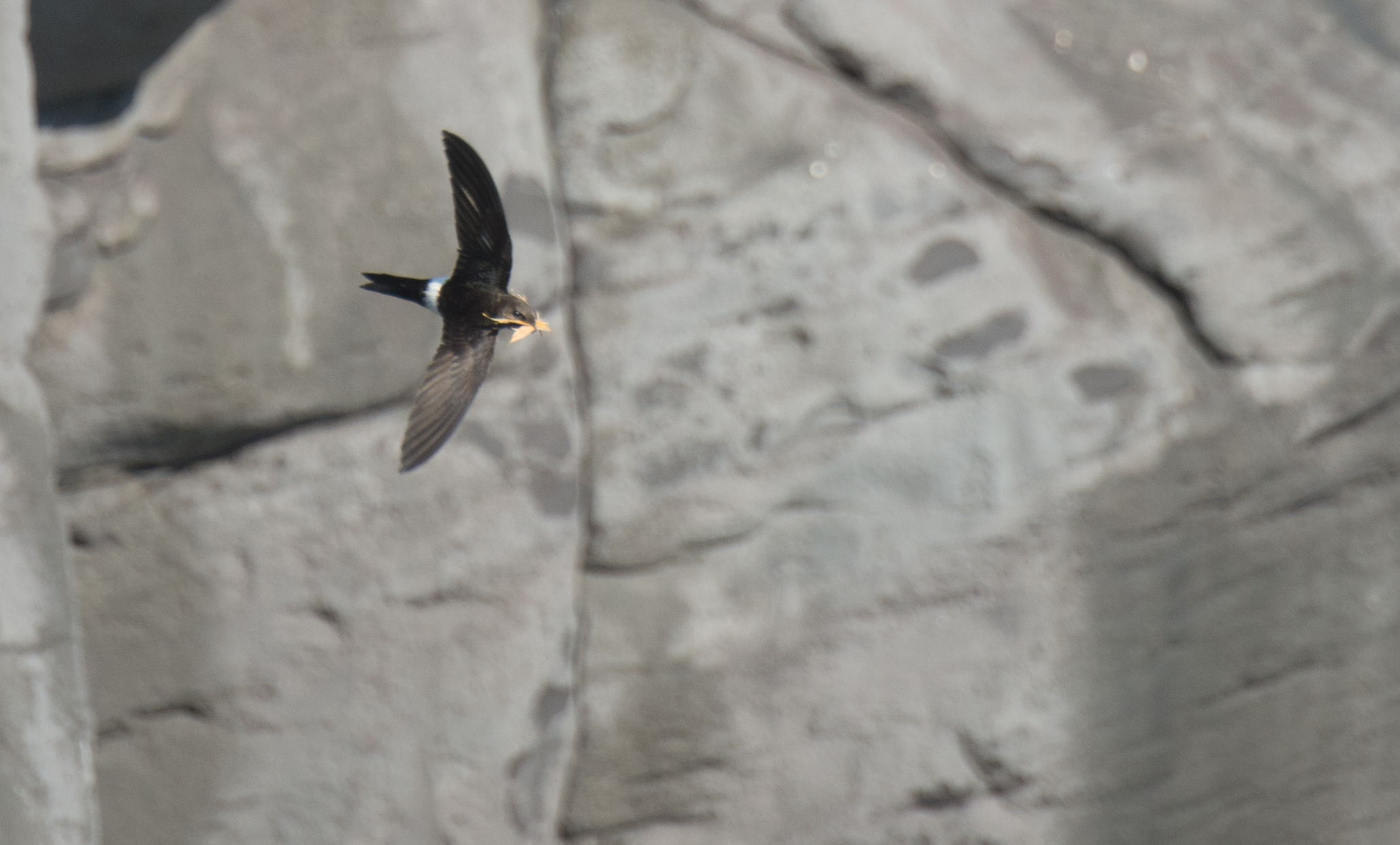
Flying with nesting material near coastal cliffs in Japan

Most Apus swift species nest in rocky areas, and the majority will accept human habitations as a substitute for natural sites. The Pacific swift is a colonial species that nests in sheltered locations such as caves, crevices in vertical rock faces (including sea-cliffs), or under the eaves of houses. The nest is a half-cup of feathers, dry grass and other light vegetation collected in flight, cemented with saliva and attached to a ledge or vertical surface with the same substance. Two or three eggs is the normal clutch, the number varying with geographical location. In areas where three eggs are usual, a fourth may occasionally be laid; no larger clutches are known. The eggs are white, as with all swifts, and 24–27.5 × 16–17 mm (0.95–1.08 × 0.63–0.67 in) in size. They are incubated by both parents for about 17 days prior to hatching as unfeathered and blind altricial chicks. Both adults brood and feed the chicks, which fledge in an average 40.5 days.

Swifts as a family have smaller egg clutches and much longer and more variable incubation and fledging times than passerines with similarly sized eggs, resembling tubenoses in these developmental factors. Young birds reach a maximum weight heavier than their parents; they can cope with not being fed for long periods of time, and delay their feather growth when undernourished. Swifts and seabirds have generally secure nest sites, but their food sources are unreliable, whereas passerines are vulnerable in the nest but food is usually plentiful. These adaptations mean that when conditions are good, the survival rate is very high. One large Yellow Sea colony had hatching success of 73.5%, with 63.6% of the chicks fledging. The average productivity was 1.24 fledged young per pair per year.

=== Feeding ===
All swifts feed on insects caught in flight, and the Pacific swift has been recorded as consuming bees, wasps, termites, moths and flies. A Chinese study found that it caught a wide variety of insect prey and considered that most of the species eaten were harmful to agriculture or forestry, leading to improved agricultural yield in a number of geographical domaines. The Pacific swift tends to hunt higher than sympatric swifts, sharing its airspace mainly with white-throated needletails. It typically feeds at heights up to 300 m (980 ft), only flying close to the ground in poor weather. It often forages near low-pressure areas, which serve both to raise insects from the ground and to give the swifts additional lift. The swifts circle through the insect swarms in flocks typically of tens or hundreds of birds, although sometimes reaching tens of thousands in Australia. In Siberia, Pacific swifts feed at dusk to much later hours than the common swift, sometimes until midnight, and migrants have been seen flying with bats in the Philippines. The young are fed balls of insects bound with saliva. During bad weather, increased competition leads to malnourishment within populations, where young swifts are often not fed for days and survive on stored body fat.

== Predators and parasites ==
Swifts spend most of their time in flight. Few birds have the necessary speed and agility to catch them, hobbies being the main exception. The nest sites are usually sufficiently inaccessible to be beyond the reach of snakes or mammalian predators.

This swift is host to feather mites including Eustathia cultrifera, Chauliacia canarisi and C. securigera. Biting parasites include the louse fly Crataerina pacifica, bat bugs and sucking mites. Chewing lice include two species first identified on this swift. Davaineidae tapeworms have been found as internal parasites.

== Status ==
The Pacific swift has a very large range, exceeding 10,000,000 km^{2} (3,800,000 mi^{2}). Its population is unknown, although it is common throughout its breeding range with no evidence of any decline. It is therefore classified by the International Union for Conservation of Nature as being of least concern. There appear to be no significant threats to this bird; predation is low, and this swift is not tied to a particular habitat. Some birds may die through misadventure or become exhausted when lost on migration (the first record for the Western Palaearctic was found resting on a North Sea gas platform), but swifts have high survival rates and are generally long-lived. The common swift, a close relative of the Pacific swift, has been recorded as reaching 21 years old.

== Cited texts ==
- Brazil, Mark (2009). Birds of East Asia. London: A & C Black. ISBN 978-0-7136-7040-0.
- Chantler, Phillip (1999). "Family Apodidae (Swifts)". In del Hoyo, Josep; Elliott, Andrew; Sargatal, Jordi (eds.). Handbook of the Birds of the World. Vol. 5: Barn-owls to Hummingbirds. Barcelona, Spain: Lynx Edicions. ISBN 84-87334-25-3.
- Chantler, Phillip; Driessens, Gerard (2000). Swifts: A Guide to the Swifts and Treeswifts of the World. London: Pica Press. ISBN 1-873403-83-6.
- van Duivendijk, Nils (2011). Advanced Bird ID Handbook: The Western Palearctic. London: New Holland. ISBN 978-1-78009-022-1.
- Jobling, James A (2010). The Helm Dictionary of Scientific Bird Names. London: Christopher Helm. ISBN 978-1-4081-2501-4.
- Kaufman, Kenn (2001). Lives of North American Birds. Oxford: Houghton Mifflin Harcourt. ISBN 0-618-15988-6.
- Latham, John (1801). Supplementum indicis ornithologici sive systematis ornithologiae (in Latin). Londoni: Leigh et Sotheby.
- Peterson, Paul; Atyeo, Warren T; Moss, W Wayne (2007). Feather Mite Family Eustathiidae (Acarina: Sarcoptiformes): Monographs of The Academy of Natural Sciences of Philadelphia, No. 21. Philadelphia: Academy of Natural Sciences. ISBN 978-1-4223-1927-7.
- Scopoli, Giovanni Antonio (1777). Introductio ad Historianum naturalem (in Latin). Prague: Wolfgangum Gerle.
- Simpson, Ken; Day, Nicolas (2010). A Field Guide to the Birds of Australia, 8th Edition. London: Penguin. ISBN 978-0-670-07231-6.
