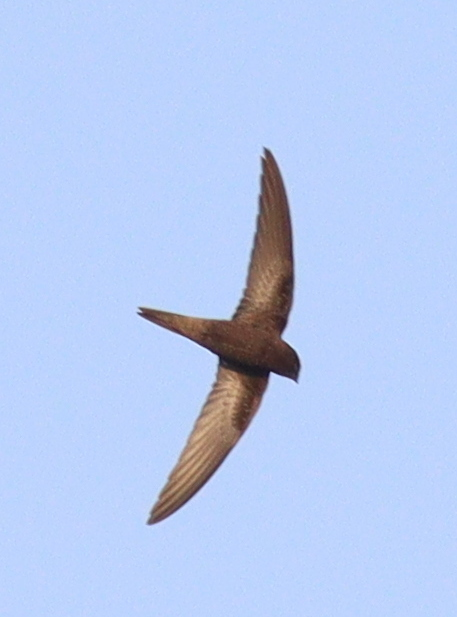

Conservation status
- Least Concern (IUCN 3.1)

Scientific classification
- Kingdom: Animalia
- Phylum: Chordata
- Class: Aves
- Order: Apodiformes
- Family: Apodidae
- Genus: Apus
- Species: A. batesi

Binomial name
- Apus batesi (Sharpe, 1904)

= Bates's swift =

Species of bird

Bates's swift (Apus batesi) is a species of small swift in the family Apodidae which is found in western Africa.

== Description ==
Bates's swift is a small, slender swift with a deeply forked tail which is often held closed to form a point. It has a glossy black plumage with an indistinct pale patch on the throat. It is normally silent but makes a high-pitched trill near the nest. They are 14 cm in length.

== Distribution ==
Bates's swift is found from Liberia and Guinea then patchily eastwards to Ghana, Nigeria and Cameroon, south to Gabon and the northern Congo. Its presence in Sierra Leone is unconfirmed, as are reports from the eastern democratic Republic of Congo.

== Habitat ==
Bates's swift is a rainforest species and is found in areas close to cliffs and crags.

== Habits ==
Bates's swift forages above the canopy of the rainforest using a fluttering flight, with short periods of gliding occasionally interrupting the rapid wing beats. It may be seen singly, or in small flocks and in mixed flocks with other swifts and hirundines. It nests solitarily in the old nests of hirundines and other swifts, mainly forest swallow and possibly mottled spinetail and lesser striped swallow. Breeding has been recorded in September to March in Gabon and egg laying has been noted in Cameroon in May and June.

== Taxonomy and naming ==
Recent molecular studies have placed this species in a clade with white-rumped swift, horus swift, house swift and little swift.

Its common name and Latin binomial commemorate George Latimer Bates (1863–1940), an American naturalist who traveled in West Africa.
