= Fork-tailed swift =

Fork-tailed swift is the historic name of a kind of bird which has since been divided taxonomically into four species. It could refer to any of four different species of Apus swifts:

- Pacific swift, Apus pacificus
- Salim Ali's swift, Apus salimali
- Blyth's swift, Apus leuconyx
- Cook's swift, Apus cooki
