= Black swift =

Black swift may refer to several species of birds, including:

- African black swift, found in sub-Saharan Africa
- American black swift, found in North America

== See also ==
- Malagasy black swift
