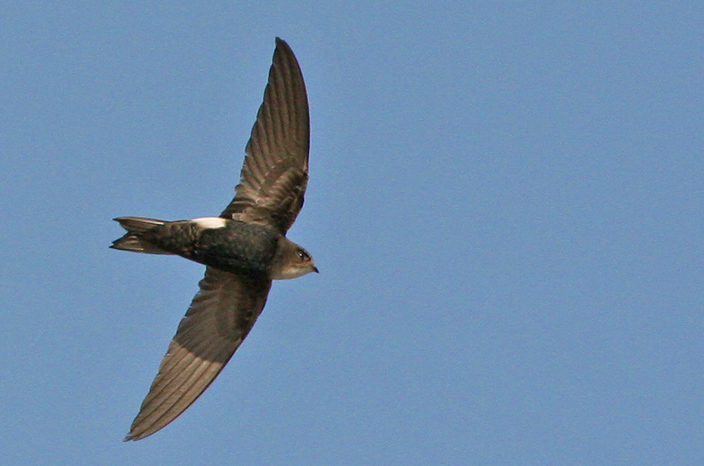
- Horus swift in South Luangwa National Park, Zambia

Conservation status
- Least Concern (IUCN 3.1)

Scientific classification
- Kingdom: Animalia
- Phylum: Chordata
- Class: Aves
- Clade: Strisores
- Order: Apodiformes
- Family: Apodidae
- Genus: Apus
- Species: A. horus

Binomial name
- Apus horus (Heuglin, 1869)

Subspecies
- Apus horus toulsoni (Loanda swift)

= Horus swift =

Species of bird

The Horus swift (Apus horus) is a small bird in the swift family Apodidae that is found in sub-Saharan Africa. Horus, whose name this bird commemorates, was the ancient Egyptian god of the sun, son of Osiris and Isis.

== Taxonomy ==
The Horus swift was formally described in 1869 by the German explorer and ornithologist Theodor von Heuglin under the binomial name Cypselus horus. The specific epithet is from Ancient Egyptian mythology: Horus was the god of the sun. This species is now one of 20 swifts placed in the genus Apus that was introduced in 1777 by the Italian naturalist Giovanni Antonio Scopoli. The species is treated as monotypic. The subspecies A. h. fuscobrunneus and A. h. toulsoni were formerly recognised but are now considered to be colour morphs of the nominate form.

== Description ==
The Horus swift is 13–15 cm (5.1–5.9 in) long and quite bulky. It appears entirely blackish except for a white patch on the chin and a white rump. It has a medium length forked tail. It has a fluttering flight like little swift. The little swift has a square tail, and more extensive white on the rump than Horus, and white-rumped swift has a more deeply forked tail and a narrower white band. The call is a buzzing peeeeooo, peeeeooo.

== Distribution and habitat ==
The swift breeds in sub-Saharan Africa. It has an extensive continuous distribution from eastern and southern South Africa north to southern Zambia and central Mozambique, and has recently colonised the De Hoop Nature Reserve area of the Western Cape. It also occurs very discontinuously in much of the rest of the sub-Saharan region, with the Ethiopian mountains and the area from central Kenya into Uganda having large populations. Identification difficulties confuse the limits of this species' range. Birds in South Africa are migratory, wintering further north. Other populations are resident apart from local movements.

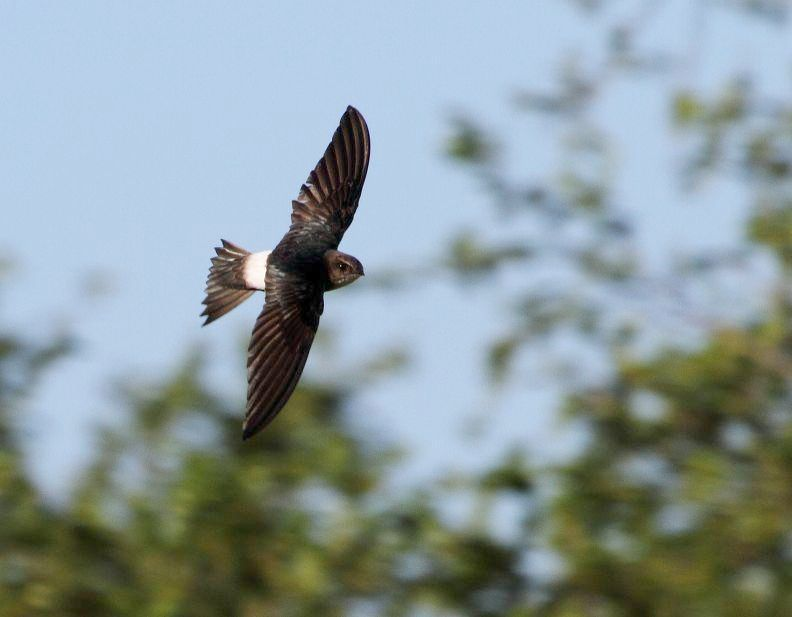

== Behaviour ==
The Horus swift breeds in old burrows of bee-eaters, ground woodpeckers, kingfishers and martins, which are typically in natural or artificial sandy banks. The flat nest of vegetation and hair, glued with saliva is built at the end of the tunnel and 1-4 eggs are laid. The eggs are incubated for 28 days to hatching, and the fledging period is about 6 weeks. This species is not colonial, but the nature of its breeding habitat means that a number of pairs may be scattered through a bee-eater or banded martin colony. It feeds at middle levels over adjacent habitats, but avoids large towns.
