= Loanda swift =

Scientific classification
- Kingdom: Animalia
- Phylum: Chordata
- Class: Aves
- Order: Apodiformes
- Family: Apodidae
- Genus: Apus
- Species: A. horus
- Subspecies: A. h. toulsoni

Trinomial name
- Apus horus toulsoni (Barboza du Bocage, 1877)

Synonyms
- Apus toulsoni

Subspecies of bird

The Loanda swift (Apus horus toulsoni) is a bird in the family Apodidae. Many taxonomists consider it to be a subspecies of the Horus swift. It is found in Angola and Republic of the Congo.
