= Chauliacia canarisi =

Scientific classification
- Kingdom: Animalia
- Phylum: Arthropoda
- Subphylum: Chelicerata
- Class: Arachnida
- Order: Sarcoptiformes
- Family: Eustathiidae
- Genus: Chauliacia
- Species: C. canarisi

Binomial name
- Chauliacia canarisi Peterson, Atyeo & Moss, 1980

Species of mite

Chauliacia canarisi is a feather mite found on swifts.
