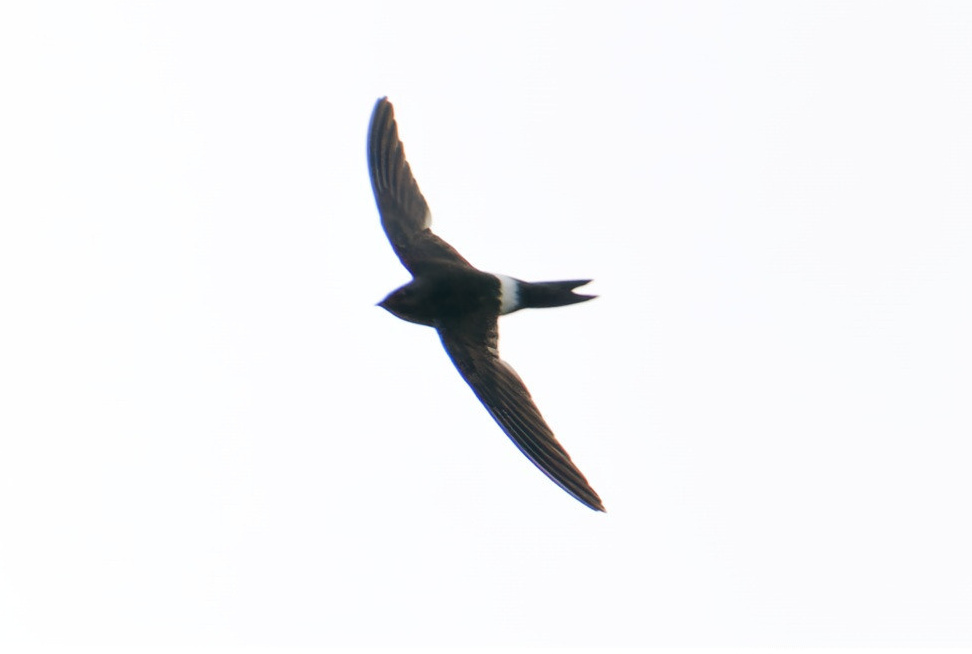

Scientific classification
- Kingdom: Animalia
- Phylum: Chordata
- Class: Aves
- Order: Apodiformes
- Family: Apodidae
- Genus: Apus
- Species: A. salimalii

Binomial name
- Apus salimalii Lack, 1958

= Salim Ali's swift =

Species of bird

Salim Ali's swift (Apus salimalii) is a small bird, superficially similar to a house martin. It is, however, completely unrelated to those passerine species, since swifts are in the order Apodiformes. The resemblances between the groups are due to convergent evolution reflecting similar life styles.

These birds have very short legs which they use only for clinging to vertical surfaces, almost never settling voluntarily on the ground. The scientific name of their genus comes from the Greek απους, apous, meaning "without feet". Salim Ali's swifts spend most of their lives in the air, living on the insects they catch in their beaks.

Salim Ali's swifts breed from the eastern Tibetan Plateau eastwards through western Sichuan province. This species is migratory; however, its wintering range is unknown. This swift is longer tailed and has a narrower white rump compared to other species in the complex. A 2011 study split this species from the fork-tailed swift complex, with many taxomonists recognizing it as a full species.

These swifts build their nests on cliffs, laying 2 or 3 eggs. A swift will return to the same site year after year, rebuilding its nest when necessary.

Salim Ali's swifts are similar in size to common swift, and they are black except for a white rump. They can be distinguished from a partially leucistic common swift by the deeper tail fork, longer wings, bigger head and larger white throat patch. It was previously mis-categorized as an alternative name for Apus pacificus kanoi.

The common name and specific name of the species honors Indian ornithologist Salim Ali.
