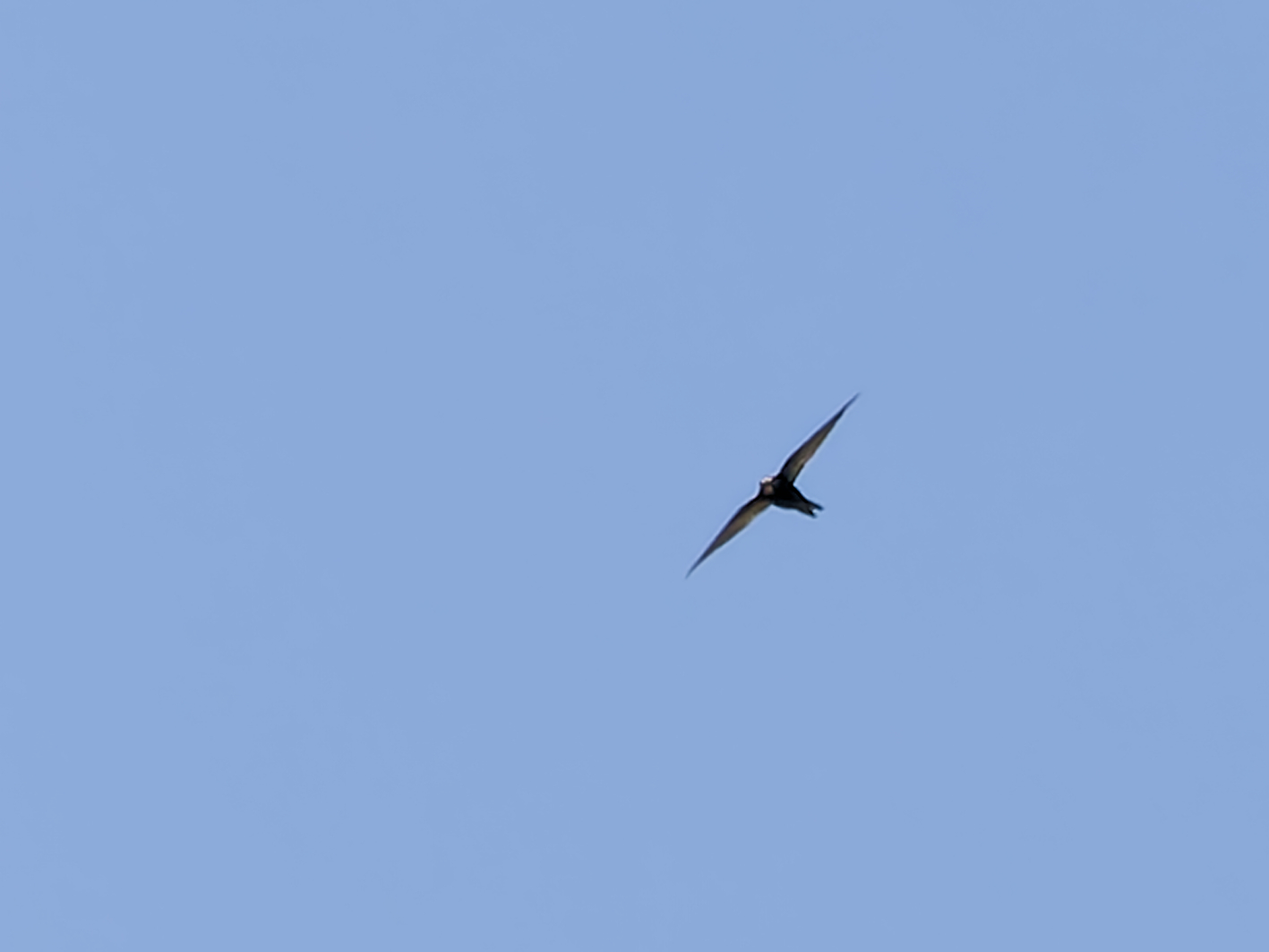

Conservation status
- Least Concern (IUCN 3.1)

Scientific classification
- Kingdom: Animalia
- Phylum: Chordata
- Class: Aves
- Order: Apodiformes
- Family: Apodidae
- Genus: Apus
- Species: A. niansae

Binomial name
- Apus niansae (Reichenow, 1887)

= Nyanza swift =

Species of bird

The Nyanza swift (Apus niansae) is a species of swift in the family Apodidae. It is found in Eritrea, Ethiopia, Kenya, Somalia, South Sudan, Tanzania, and Uganda.

== Identification ==
The Nyanza swift, also known as the brown swift, is a medium sized bird with sleek wings, along with a small and compact head. It has a short, forked tail, blunt rectrices, and small coverts. In contrast with its head and torso, the Nyanza swift's outer wings are pale brown along with a pale throat. In the field, the Nyanza swift is commonly unseen and hard to identify without a good view or clear picture. It is commonly spotted in the rainy season and scarce during dry parts of the year. The anatomy of the Nyanza swift is not well known.

== Subspecies ==
There are 2 subspecies

- Apus niansae niansas
- Apus niansa somalicus

== Habitat ==
The Nyanza swift can be found in areas of high elevation, gorges, cliff faces, and human settlements like cities and towns. It has been spotted in places such as Eritrea, Western Ethiopia, Eastern Uganda, Western Kenya, and Northern Tanzania. The Nyanza swift uses wet areas to search for sources of food and can rarely be found in lowland areas.

== Migration ==
The Nyanza swift has been recorded from March to September in North Somalia as a partially migratory bird. It is also a terrestrial bird that has been seen during the rainy season from February to April and June to September within the Addis Ababa colonies. Depending on its habitat, the Nyanza swift can be residential and populations from Kenya are believed to be wintering birds.

== Diet and activity ==
The Nyanza swift is a scavenger bird, which feeds on other dead animals. It also consumes bugs and insects such as flies, beetles, and bees. The Nyanza swift is most active in the early mornings near dawn, and seen one to two hours before sunset, feeding throughout the day. When nesting activity presents itself among the Nyanza swift, it stays after throughout the day, rather than strictly at dawn or dusk.

== Breeding ==
The Nyanza swift nests in colonies around steep rocky regions, gorges, cliff faces, among tall buildings, and under house eaves in air vents. It commonly nests during two periods of rainy seasons with June through September being the most optimal season and February through April, which is a less uncommon time. The Nyanza swift builds its nest using feathers, grass, and saliva. If it cannot find enough material for its nest, the Nyanza swift will sometimes use mud and concrete fragments. After its eggs have been laid, the Nyanza swift's incubation period is nineteen days at minimum.
