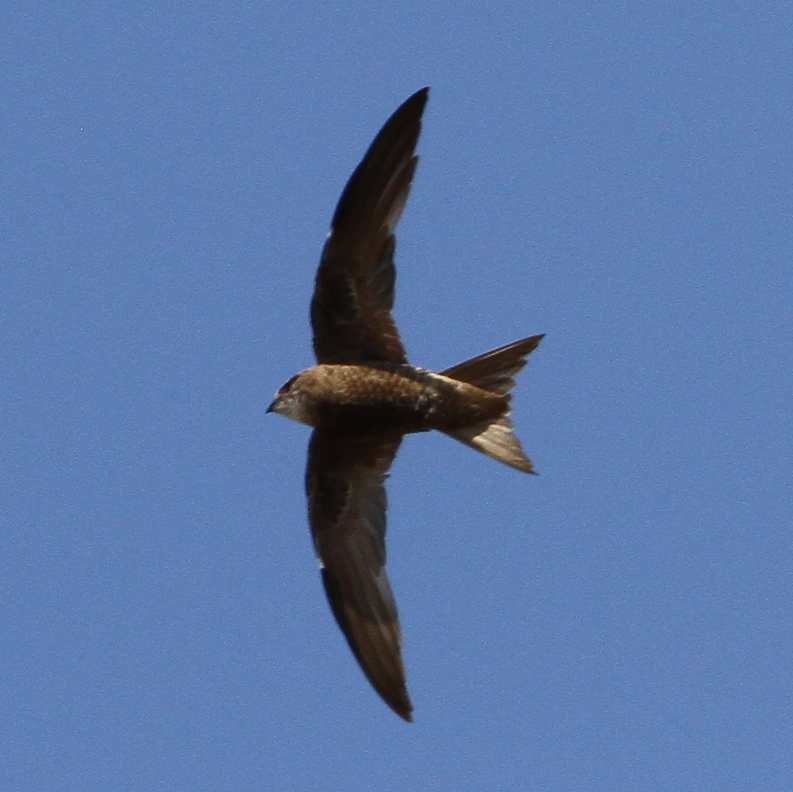

Conservation status
- Least Concern (IUCN 3.1)

Scientific classification
- Kingdom: Animalia
- Phylum: Chordata
- Class: Aves
- Clade: Strisores
- Order: Apodiformes
- Family: Apodidae
- Genus: Apus
- Species: A. berliozi

Binomial name
- Apus berliozi Ripley, 1966

= Forbes-Watson's swift =

Species of bird

Forbes-Watson's swift (Apus berliozi) is a species of swift in the family Apodidae. It breeds in coastal areas of Somalia and the southern Arabian Peninsula and on the island of Socotra. In the non-breeding season it has been observed as far south as coastal Mozambique.
