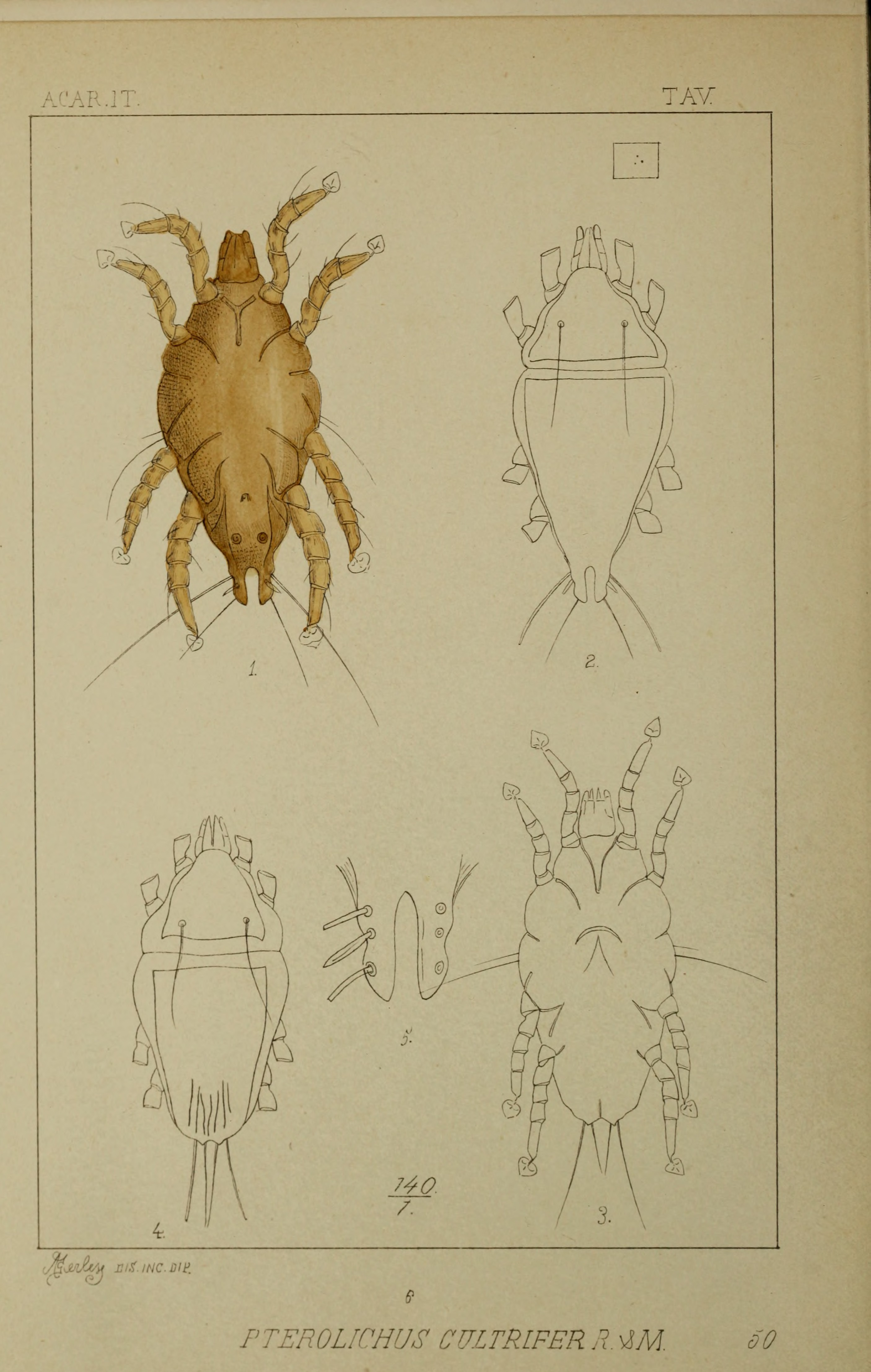
- Drawing of Eustathia cultrifera, 1888

Scientific classification
- Kingdom: Animalia
- Phylum: Arthropoda
- Subphylum: Chelicerata
- Class: Arachnida
- Order: Sarcoptiformes
- Family: Eustathiidae
- Genus: Eustathia
- Species: E. cultrifera

Binomial name
- Eustathia cultrifera (Robin & Mégnin, 1877)

= Eustathia cultrifera =

Species of mite

Eustathia cultrifera is a feather mite found on swifts.
