= Chauliacia securigera =

Scientific classification
- Kingdom: Animalia
- Phylum: Arthropoda
- Subphylum: Chelicerata
- Class: Arachnida
- Order: Sarcoptiformes
- Family: Eustathiidae
- Genus: Chauliacia
- Species: C. securigera

Binomial name
- Chauliacia securigera (Robin & Megnin, 1877)

Species of mite

Chauliacia securigera is a feather mite found on swifts.
