= Apus boanoi =

Apus boanoi Temporal range: Early Pliocene

Scientific classification
- Kingdom: Animalia
- Phylum: Chordata
- Class: Aves
- Order: Apodiformes
- Family: Apodidae
- Genus: Apus
- Species: †A. boanoi

Binomial name
- †Apus boanoi Pavia et al., 2025

Extinct species of bird

Apus boanoi is an extinct species of swift in the genus Apus that lived during the Pliocene epoch.

== Distribution ==
Fossils of A. boanoi are known from the Zanclean site of Langebaanweg in South Africa.
