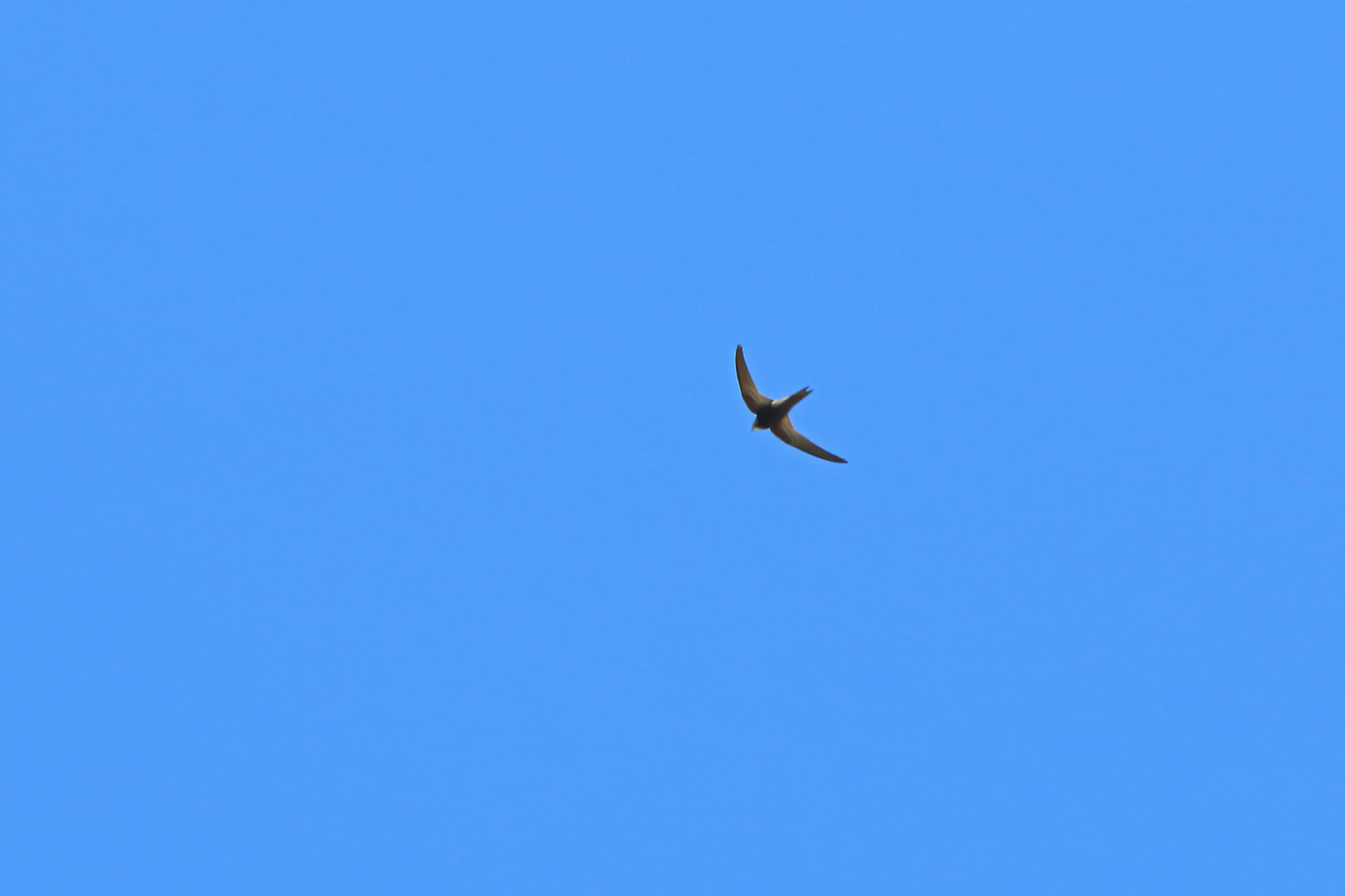

Conservation status
- Least Concern (IUCN 3.1)

Scientific classification
- Kingdom: Animalia
- Phylum: Chordata
- Class: Aves
- Clade: Strisores
- Order: Apodiformes
- Family: Apodidae
- Genus: Apus
- Species: A. balstoni

Binomial name
- Apus balstoni (Bartlett, E, 1880)
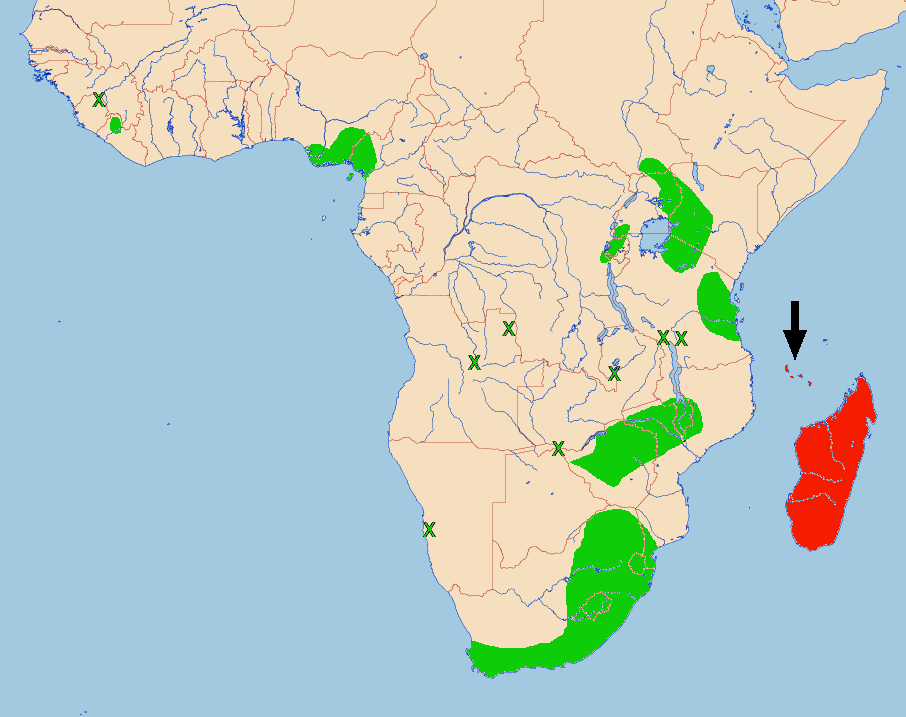
- Range Apus balstoni Apus barbatus

= Malagasy black swift =

Species of bird

The Malagasy black swift (Apus balstoni) or Madagascar swift, is a species of swift in the family Apodidae. It is endemic to Madagascar and the Comoro Islands.

== Habitat ==
Its natural habitats are subtropical or tropical moist lowland forests and subtropical or tropical moist montane forests.

== Subspecies ==
- A. b. balstoni – Madagascar
- A. b. mayottensis – Comoro Islands
