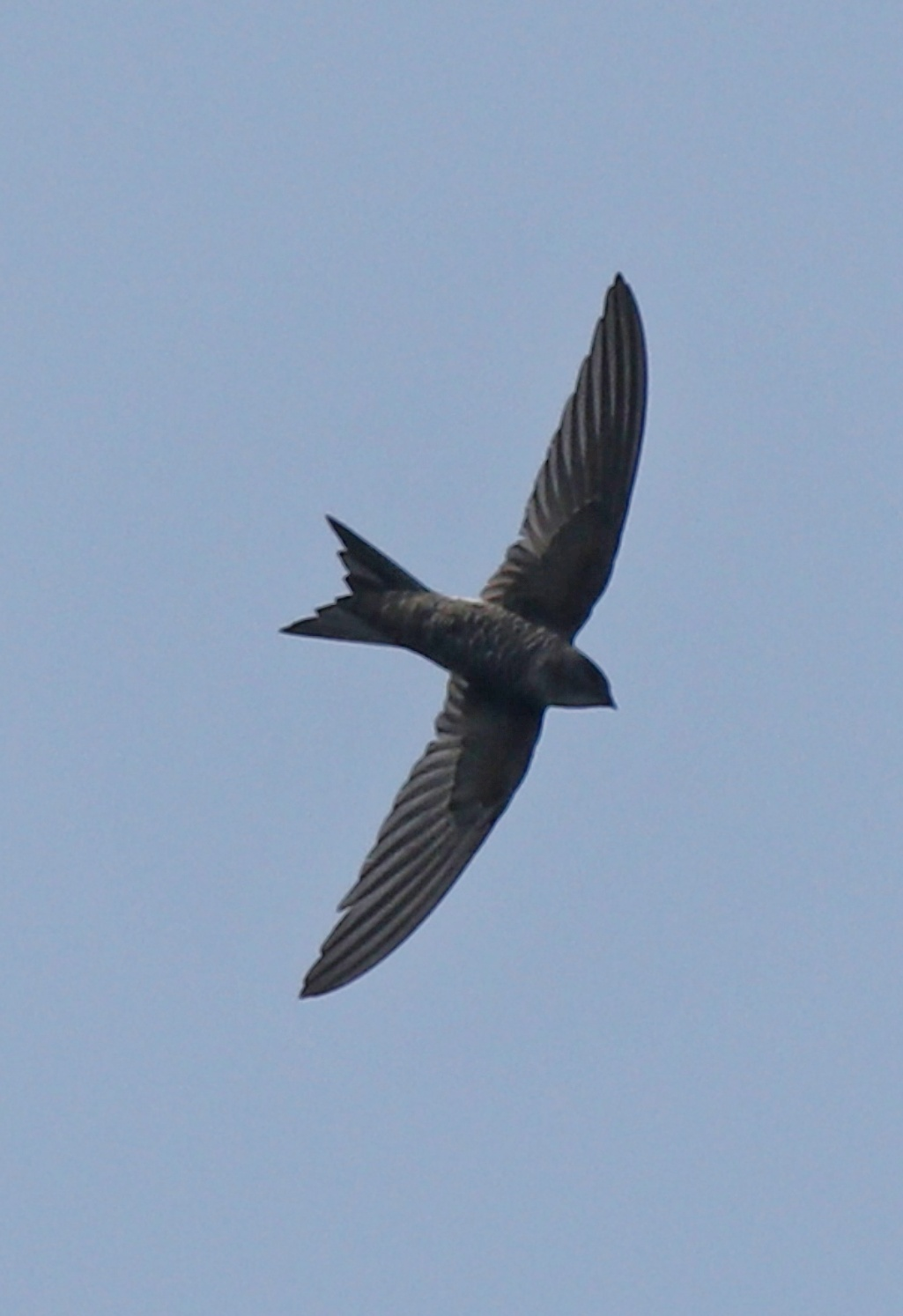

Scientific classification
- Kingdom: Animalia
- Phylum: Chordata
- Class: Aves
- Order: Apodiformes
- Family: Apodidae
- Genus: Apus
- Species: A. leuconyx

Binomial name
- Apus leuconyx (Blyth, 1845)

= Blyth's swift =

Species of bird

Blyth's swift (Apus leuconyx) is a small species of bird. It is superficially similar to a house martin, but completely unrelated to those passerine species, as swifts are in the order Apodiformes. The resemblances between the groups are due to convergent evolution reflecting similar life styles.

== Taxonomy ==
The common name commemorates Edward Blyth (1810–1873), English zoologist and Curator of the Museum of the Asiatic Society of Bengal. The scientific name comes from the Greek απους, apous, meaning "without feet".

A 2011 study has many taxonomists splitting this species from the fork-tailed swift complex.

== Description ==
Blyth's swifts are similar in size to common swift, and they are black except for a white rump. They can be distinguished from a partially leucistic common swift by the deeper tail fork, longer wings, bigger head and larger white throat patch.

== Distribution and habitat ==
Blyth's swifts breeds from the outer Himalayas through the Assam hills. This species is migratory, and winters in India and Sri Lanka.

== Behaviour and ecology ==
Blyth's swifts have very short legs which they use only for clinging to vertical surfaces. They never settle voluntarily on the ground. Blyth's swifts spend most of their lives in the air, living on the insects they catch in their beaks.

These birds build their nests on cliffs, laying 2–3 eggs. A swift will return to the same site year after year, rebuilding its nest when necessary.
