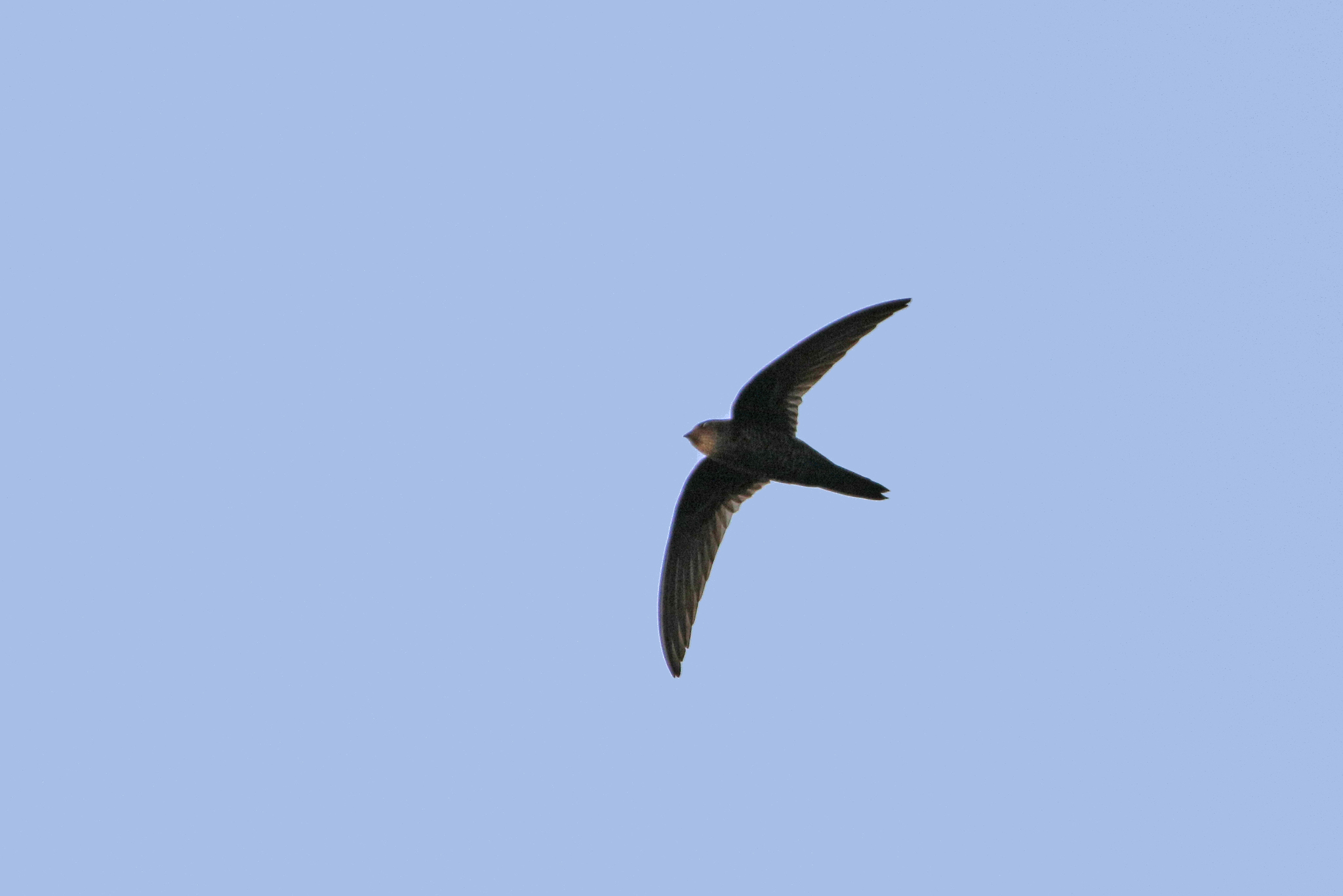

Scientific classification
- Kingdom: Animalia
- Phylum: Chordata
- Class: Aves
- Order: Apodiformes
- Family: Apodidae
- Genus: Apus
- Species: A. cooki

Binomial name
- Apus cooki (Harington, 1913)

= Cook's swift =

Species of bird

Cook's swift (Apus cooki) is a small bird, superficially similar to a house martin. It is, however, completely unrelated to those passerine species, since swifts are in the order Apodiformes. The resemblances between the groups are due to convergent evolution reflecting similar life styles.

These birds have very short legs which they use only for clinging to vertical surfaces. The scientific name comes from the Greek απους, apous, meaning "without feet". They never settle voluntarily on the ground. Blyth's swifts spend most of their lives in the air, living on the insects they catch in their beaks.

Cook's swifts breed in limestone caves of Thailand, Myanmar and Indochina. The species has a green iridescence, a shallow tail fork and is a short distance migrant. A 2011 study has many taxonomists splitting this species from the fork-tailed swift complex.

These swifts build their nests on cliffs, laying 2–3 eggs. A swift will return to the same site year after year, rebuilding its nest when necessary.

Cook's swifts are similar in size to common swift, and they are black except for a white rump. They can be distinguished from a partially leucistic common swift by the deeper tail fork, longer wings, bigger head and larger white throat patch.
