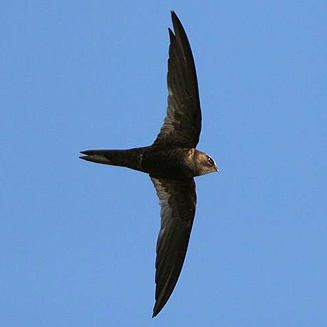

Conservation status
- Least Concern (IUCN 3.1)

Scientific classification
- Kingdom: Animalia
- Phylum: Chordata
- Class: Aves
- Clade: Strisores
- Order: Apodiformes
- Family: Apodidae
- Genus: Apus
- Species: A. barbatus

Binomial name
- Apus barbatus (Sclater, PL, 1866)
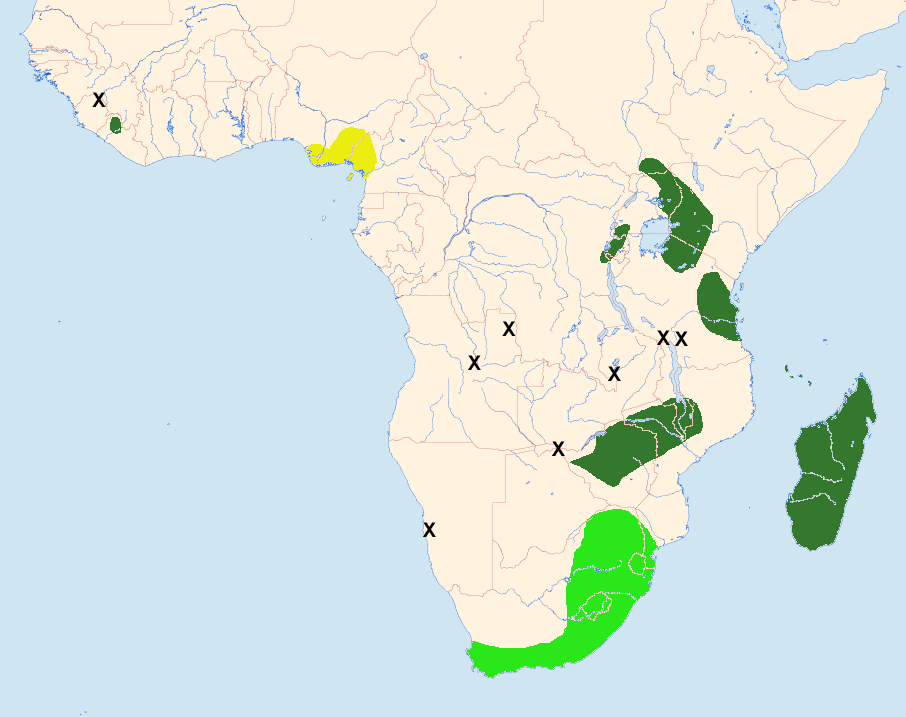
- Range migrant resident breeder summer visitor and breeder Note: Madagascar and Comoros populations sometimes afforded species status, see text.

= African black swift =

Species of bird

The African black swift (Apus barbatus), also known as the African swift or black swift, is a medium-sized bird in the swift family. It breeds in Africa discontinuously from Liberia, Cameroon, Zaire, Uganda and Kenya southwards to South Africa. The "black swifts" of Madagascar and the Comoros are either taken as two subspecies of the African black swift, or otherwise deemed a full species, the Malagasy black swift.

== Taxonomy ==
The African black swift was formally described in 1866 by the English zoologist Philip Sclater under the binomial name Cypselus barbatus based on a specimen collected in the Cape Province of South Africa. The specific epithet is Latin meaning "bearded". The African black swift is now one of sixteen species placed in the genus Apus. This species is also known as the African swift and the black swift.

Seven subspecies are recognised:

- A. b. glanvillei Benson, CW, 1967 – Sierra Leone and possibly adjacent Liberia and Ivory Coast; small breeding population discovered in Ghana perhaps extends to adjacent Togo
- A. b. serlei De Roo, AEM, 1970 – western Cameroon (Bamenda Plateau)
- A. b. roehli Reichenow, A, 1906 – northeastern Uganda and northern Kenya to eastern Democratic Republic of the Congo and Malawi; northeastern Angola
- A. b. hollidayi Benson, CW & Irwin, MPS, 1960 – Victoria Falls area on Zambia/Zimbabwe border
- A. b. oreobates Brooke, RK, 1970 – Zimbabwe and Mozambique Mount Gorongosa)
- A. b. barbatus (Sclater, PL, 1866) – South Africa
- A. b. sladeniae (Ogilvie-Grant, WR, 1904) – Fernando Po swift – locally in southeastern Nigeria, western Cameroon, Bioko Island, and western Angola

The subspecies A. b. sladeniae has sometimes been considered as a separate species, the Fernando Po swift.

== Description ==
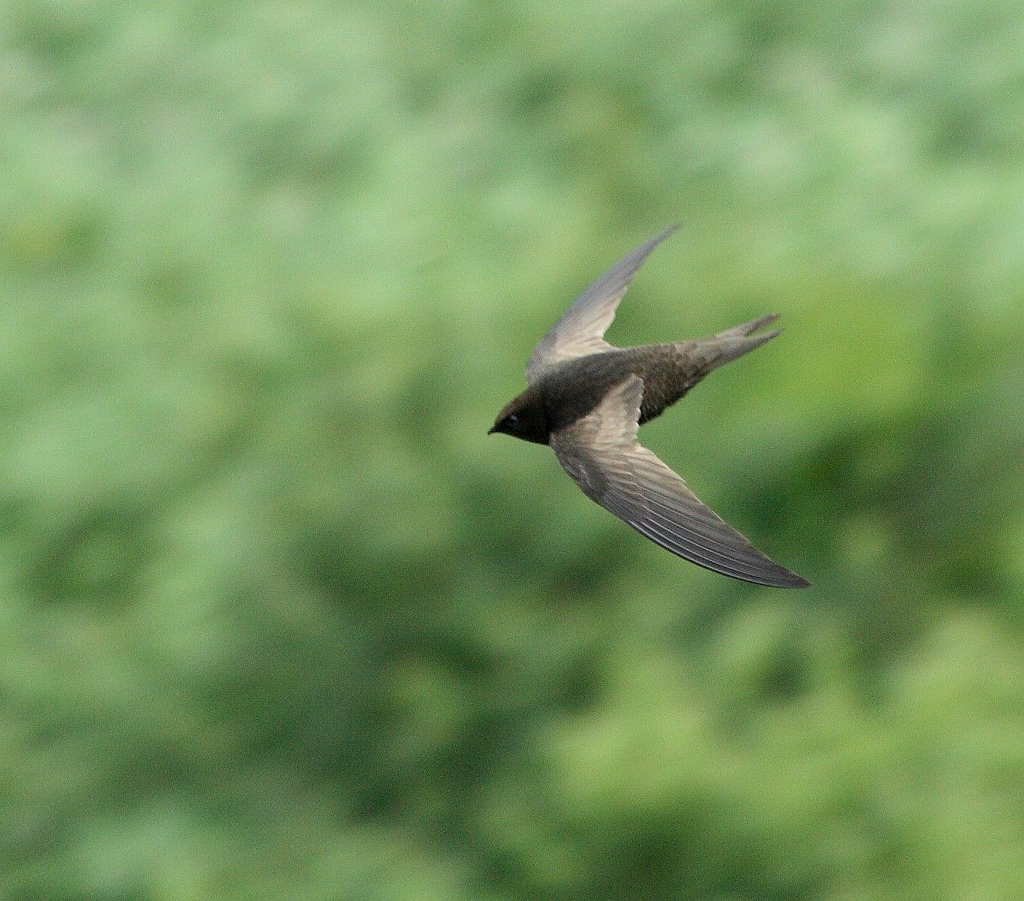
From a spot at the top of a cliff at Hlokozi, KwaZulu-Natal, South Africa

The African black swift is 16–18 cm (6.3–7.1 in) long and bulky like a pallid swift; it appears entirely blackish-brown except for a small white or pale grey patch on the chin which is not visible from a distance. It has a short forked tail and very long swept-back wings that resemble a crescent or a boomerang. This species is very similar to the common swift but can be distinguished under optimum viewing conditions by the contrast between its black back and paler secondary wing feathers. The heavier build also gives it a distinctive flight action, which consisted of a steady level flight interspersed with short glides.

The call is a strident double-rasped, hissing scream zzzzzzzZZZTT, dissimilar to that of its confusion species.

== Distribution and habitat ==
The breeding habitat is damp mountains, typically between 1,600 and 2,400 m (5,200 and 7,900 ft), and less often at lower altitudes. This species feeds readily over lowland, and can form very large flocks, often with other gregarious swifts. The nominate South African subspecies is migratory, wintering further north. Other subspecies are resident. Of the other seven accepted forms, the most widespread is the small and dark A. b. subsp. roehli of east Africa. Two other dark races, A. b. balstoni and A. b. mayottensis (see: Malagasy black swift), are restricted to Madagascar and the Comoro Islands respectively. It has been suggested that some balstoni migrate to the continental mainland when not breeding, but this has not been proved.

== Breeding ==
East African birds nest in hollow trees, whereas in South Africa this species uses cliffs, usually inland but also on the coast. The African black swift is a colonial breeder, sometimes forming mixed colonies with alpine swifts. The nest is a shallow grass cup glued to the substrate with saliva, and the typical clutch is one or two eggs.

== Sources ==
- Sinclair, Hockey and Tarboton, SASOL Birds of Southern Africa, ISBN 1-86872-721-1
