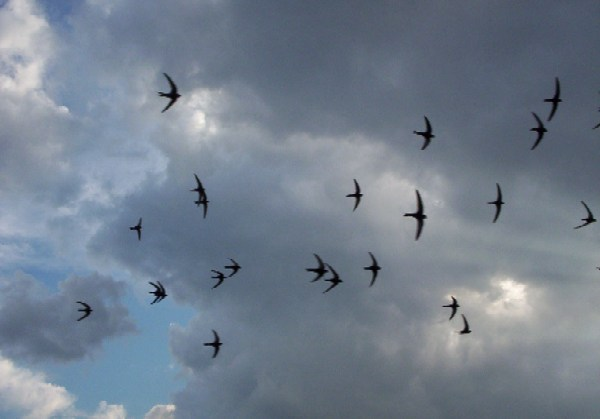
- Common swifts (Apus apus)

Scientific classification
- Kingdom: Animalia
- Phylum: Chordata
- Class: Aves
- Order: Apodiformes
- Family: Apodidae
- Subfamily: Apodinae
- Tribe: Apodini
- Genus: Apus; Scopoli, 1777

Type species
- Hirundo apus Linnaeus, 1758

Species
- See text

= Apus (bird) =

Genus of birds

The bird genus Apus comprise some of the Old World members of the family Apodidae, commonly known as swifts.

They are among the fastest birds in the world. They resemble swallows, to which they are not closely related, but have shorter tails and sickle-shaped wings. Swifts spend most of their life aloft and have very short legs, which they mostly use to cling to surfaces.

== Taxonomy ==
The genus Apus was erected by the Italian naturalist Giovanni Antonio Scopoli in 1777 based on tautonymy and the common swift which had been given the binomial name Hirundo apus by the Swedish naturalist Carl Linnaeus in 1758. The name Apus is Latin for a swift, thought by the ancients to be a type of swallow with no feet (from Ancient Greek α, a, "without", and πούς, pous, "foot").

Before the 1950s, there was some controversy over which group of organism should have the genus name Apus. In 1801, Bosc gave the genus name Apus to the small crustacean organisms known today as Triops, and later authors continued to use this term. Ludwig Keilhack suggested (in 1909) that this was incorrect since there was already an avian genus named Apus by Scopoli in 1777. The controversy was ended in 1958 when the International Commission on Zoological Nomenclature (ICZN) ruled against the use of the genus name Apus for the crustaceans and recognized the name Triops.

== Species ==
The genus contains 16 species:

- Cape Verde swift, Apus alexandri
- Common swift, Apus apus
- Plain swift, Apus unicolor
- Nyanza swift, Apus niansae
- Pallid swift, Apus pallidus
- African black swift, Apus barbatus (includes Fernando Po swift)
- Malagasy black swift, Apus balstoni
- Forbes-Watson's swift, Apus berliozi
- Bradfield's swift, Apus bradfieldi
- Pacific swift, Apus pacificus
- Salim Ali's swift, Apus salimalii
- Blyth's swift, Apus leuconyx
- Cook's swift, Apus cooki
- Dark-rumped swift, Apus acuticauda
- Little swift, Apus affinis
- House swift, Apus nipalensis
- Horus swift, Apus horus
- White-rumped swift, Apus caffer
- Bates's swift Apus batesi

Known fossil species are:

- Apus gaillardi (Middle/Late Miocene of La Grive-St.-Alban, France)
- Apus boanoi (Pliocene of South Africa)
- Apus wetmorei (Early – Late Pliocene? of SC and SE Europe)
- Apus baranensis (Late Pliocene of SE Europe)
- Apus submelba (Middle Pleistocene of Slovakia)

The Miocene "Apus" ignotus is now placed in Procypseloides.
