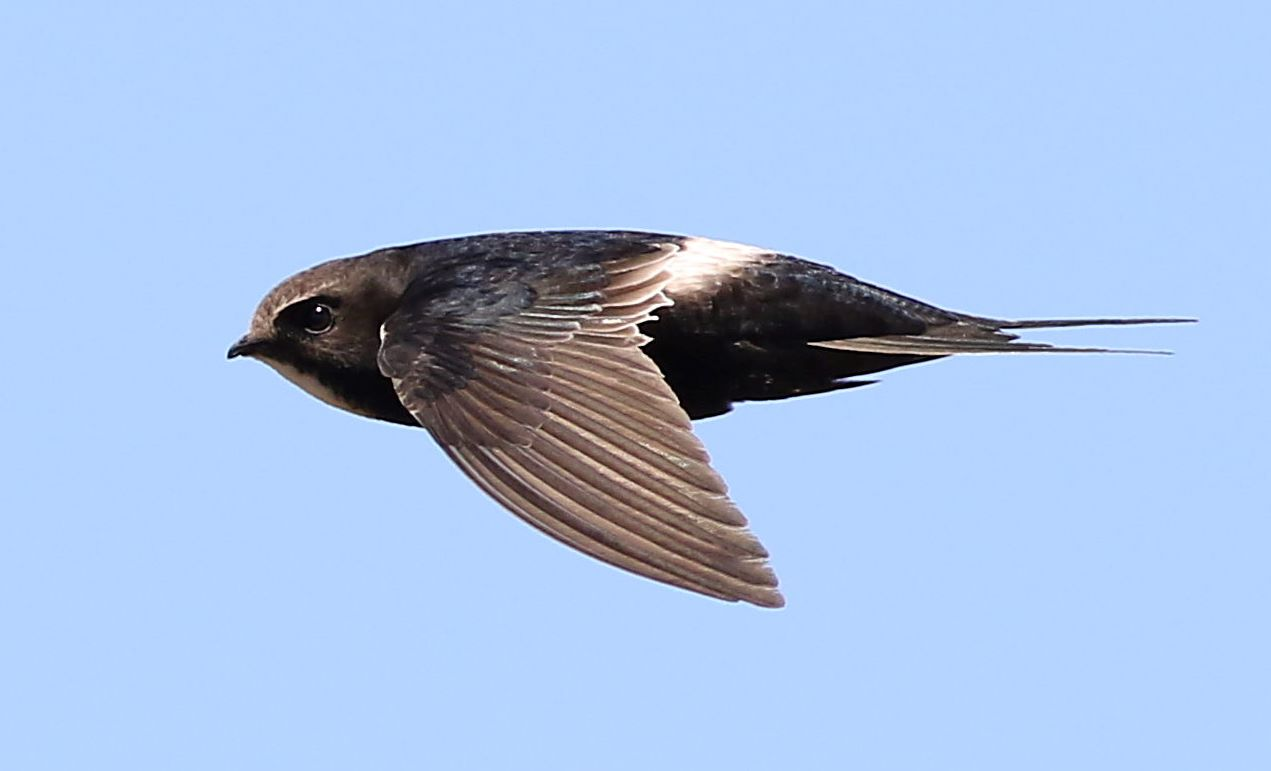

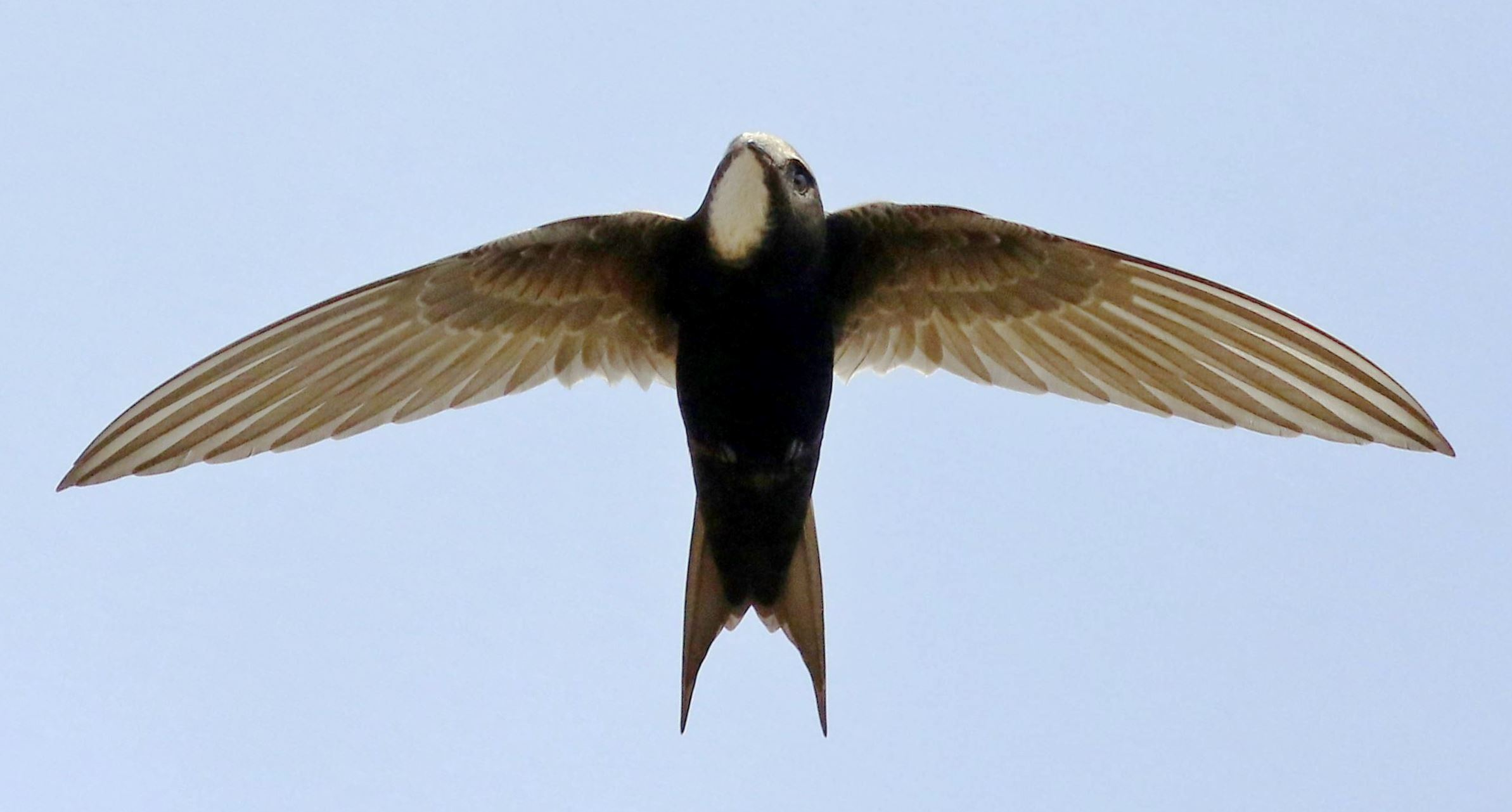

Conservation status
- Least Concern (IUCN 3.1)

Scientific classification
- Kingdom: Animalia
- Phylum: Chordata
- Class: Aves
- Order: Apodiformes
- Family: Apodidae
- Genus: Apus
- Species: A. caffer

Binomial name
- Apus caffer (Lichtenstein, MHC, 1823)

= White-rumped swift =

Species of bird

The white-rumped swift (Apus caffer) is a species of swift. Although this small bird is superficially similar to a house martin, it is not closely related to that passerine species. The resemblances between the swallows and swifts are due to convergent evolution reflecting similar life styles.

== Description ==
This 14–15.5 cm (5.5–6.1 in) long species has, like some relatives, a short forked tail and long swept-back wings that resemble a crescent or a boomerang. It is entirely dark except for a pale throat patch and a narrow white rump. It is similar to the closely related little swift, but is slimmer, darker and has a more forked tail and a narrower white rump.

== Call ==
This is a quiet species compared to little swift, but a twittering trill is sometimes given.

== Habits ==
Like other swifts they have very short legs that they use only for clinging to vertical surfaces. They never settle voluntarily on the ground, and spend most of their lives in the air, feeding on insects that they catch in their beaks. Like other swifts they drink on the wing.

== Habitat ==
The habitat of this species is dictated by that of its hosts, and is therefore normally man-made structures such as bridges and buildings.

== Breeding range ==
White-rumped swifts breed in much of sub-Saharan Africa, and have expanded into Morocco and southern Spain. The populations in Spain, Morocco and the south of Africa are migratory, although their wintering grounds are not definitively known. Birds in tropical Africa are resident apart from seasonal movements. In 2022, nesting was observed in Corsica.

== Breeding ==
This species appropriates the nests of little swifts and those swallows which build retort-shaped nests. In Europe and north Africa, this usually means the red-rumped swallow, but south of the Sahara other species like wire-tailed swallow are also parasitised. The original owners of the nests are driven away, or the white-rumps settle in the nest and refuse to move. Once occupied, the nest is lined with feathers and saliva, and one or two eggs are laid.

== Gallery ==
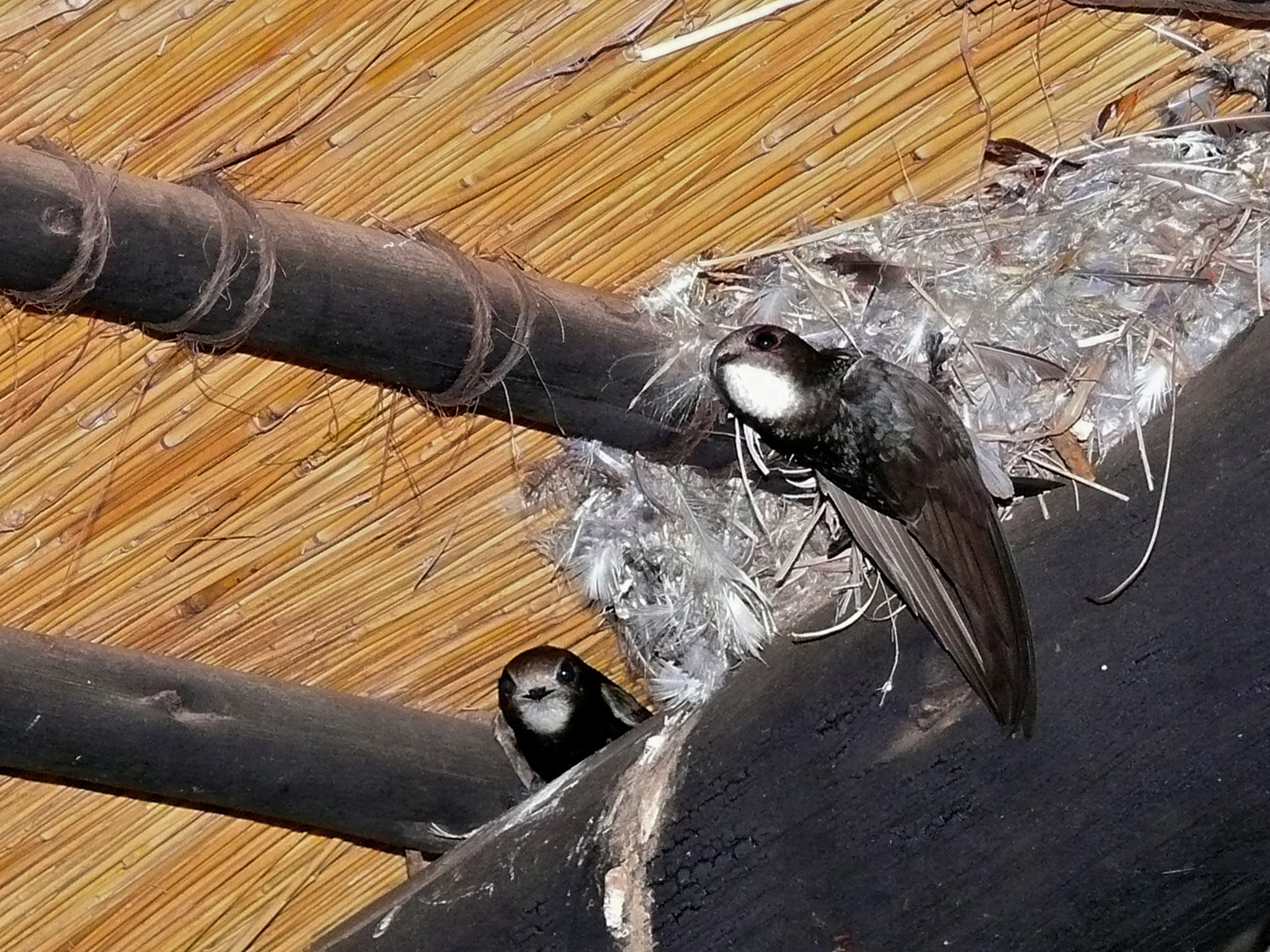
pair at their nest

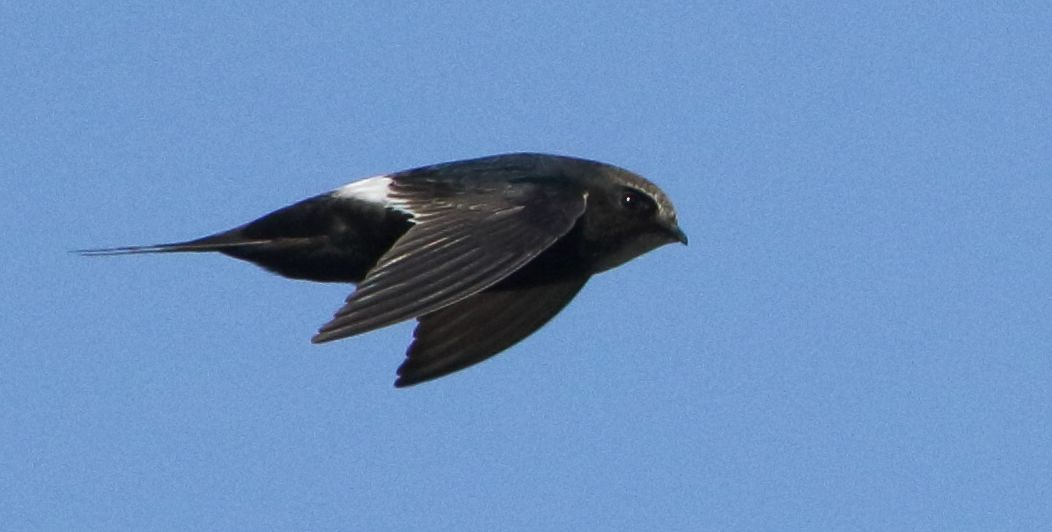

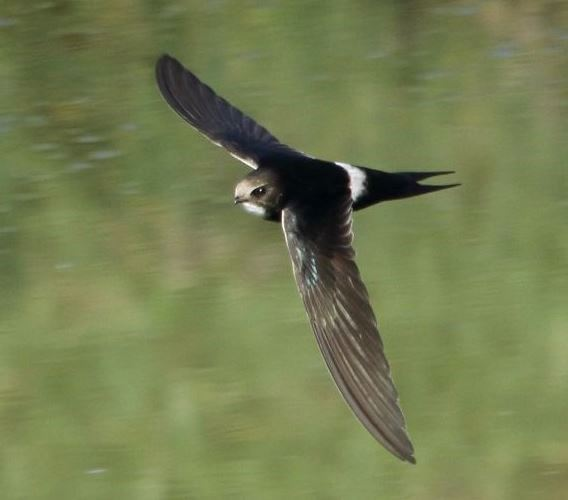

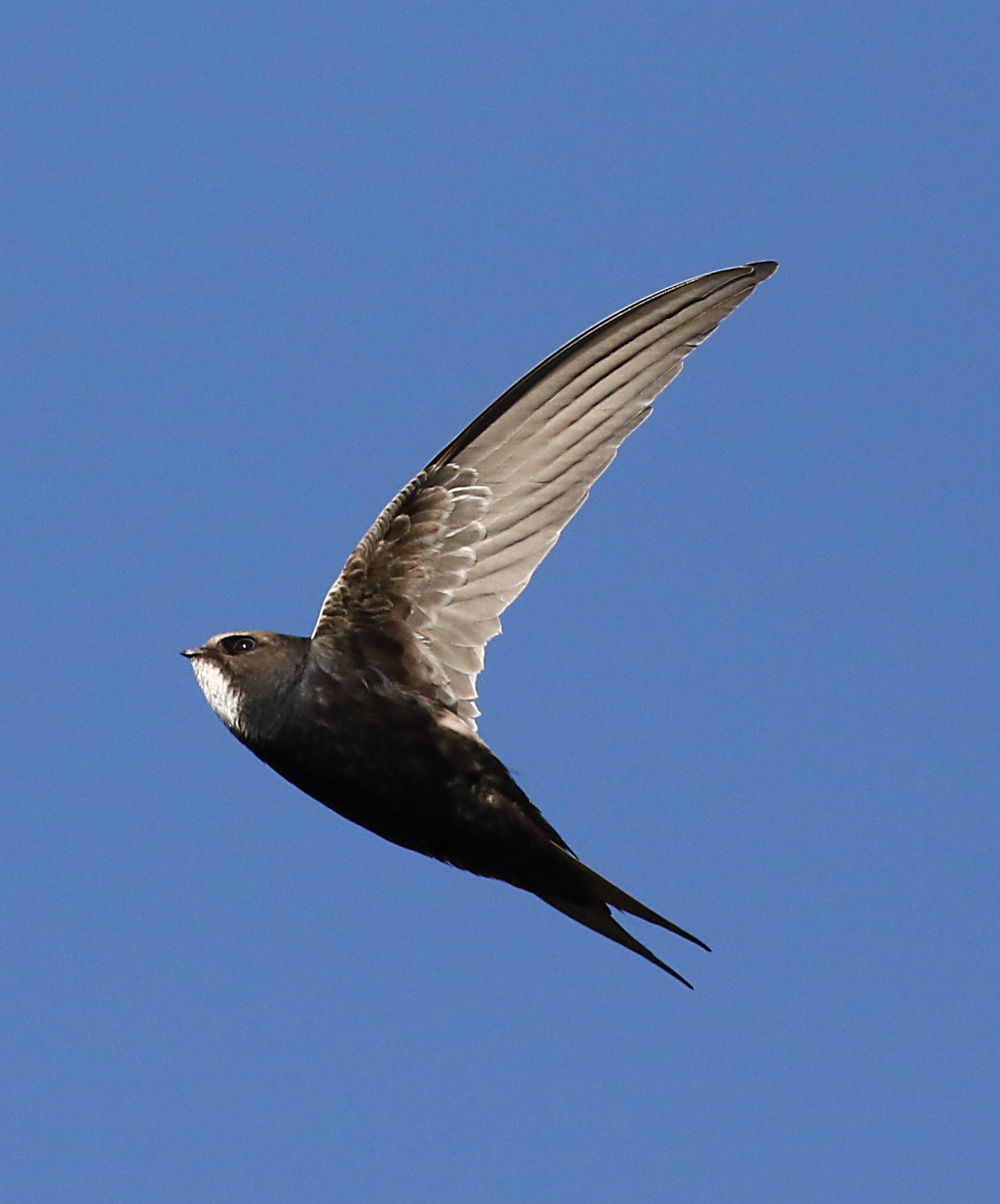

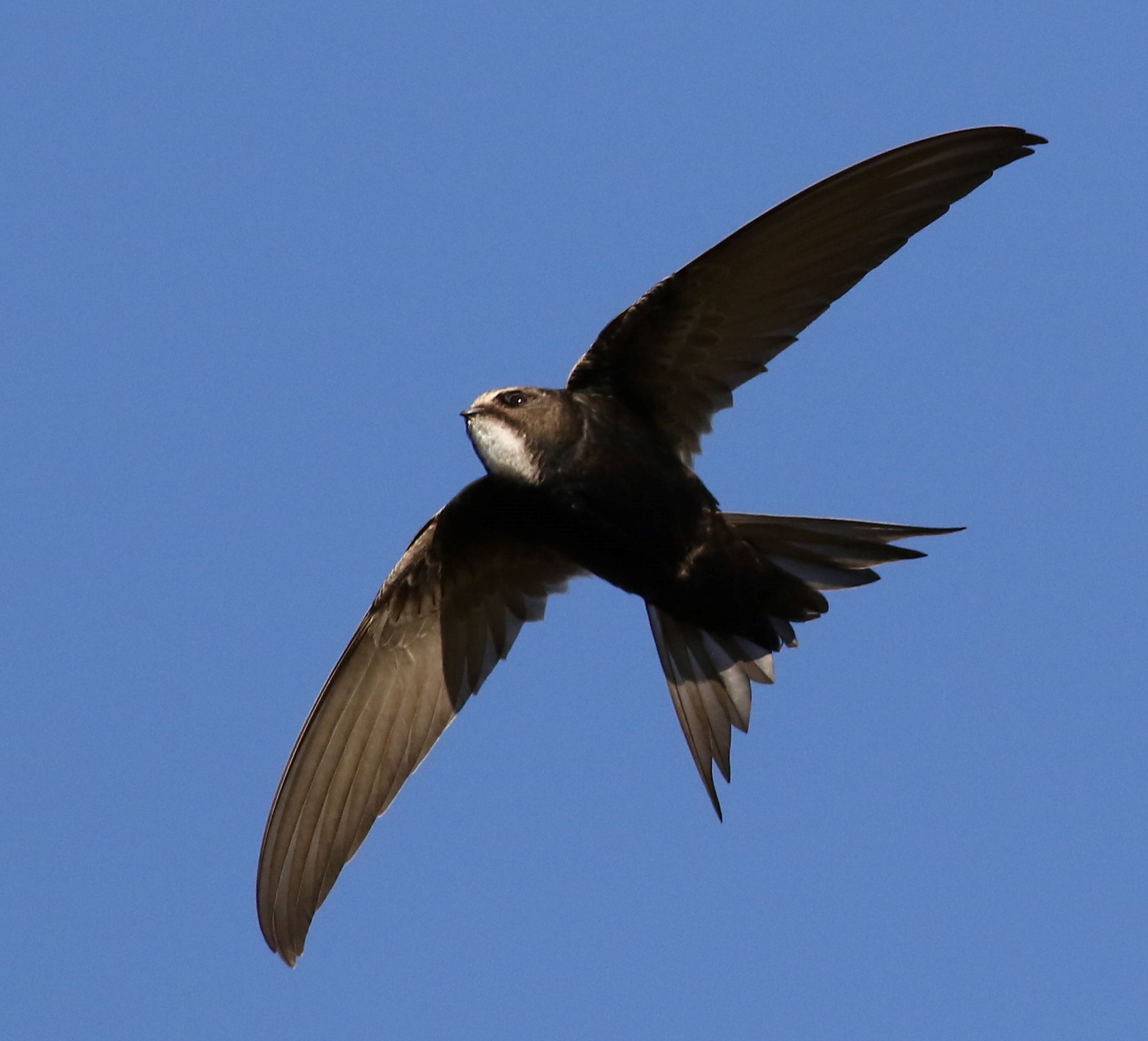

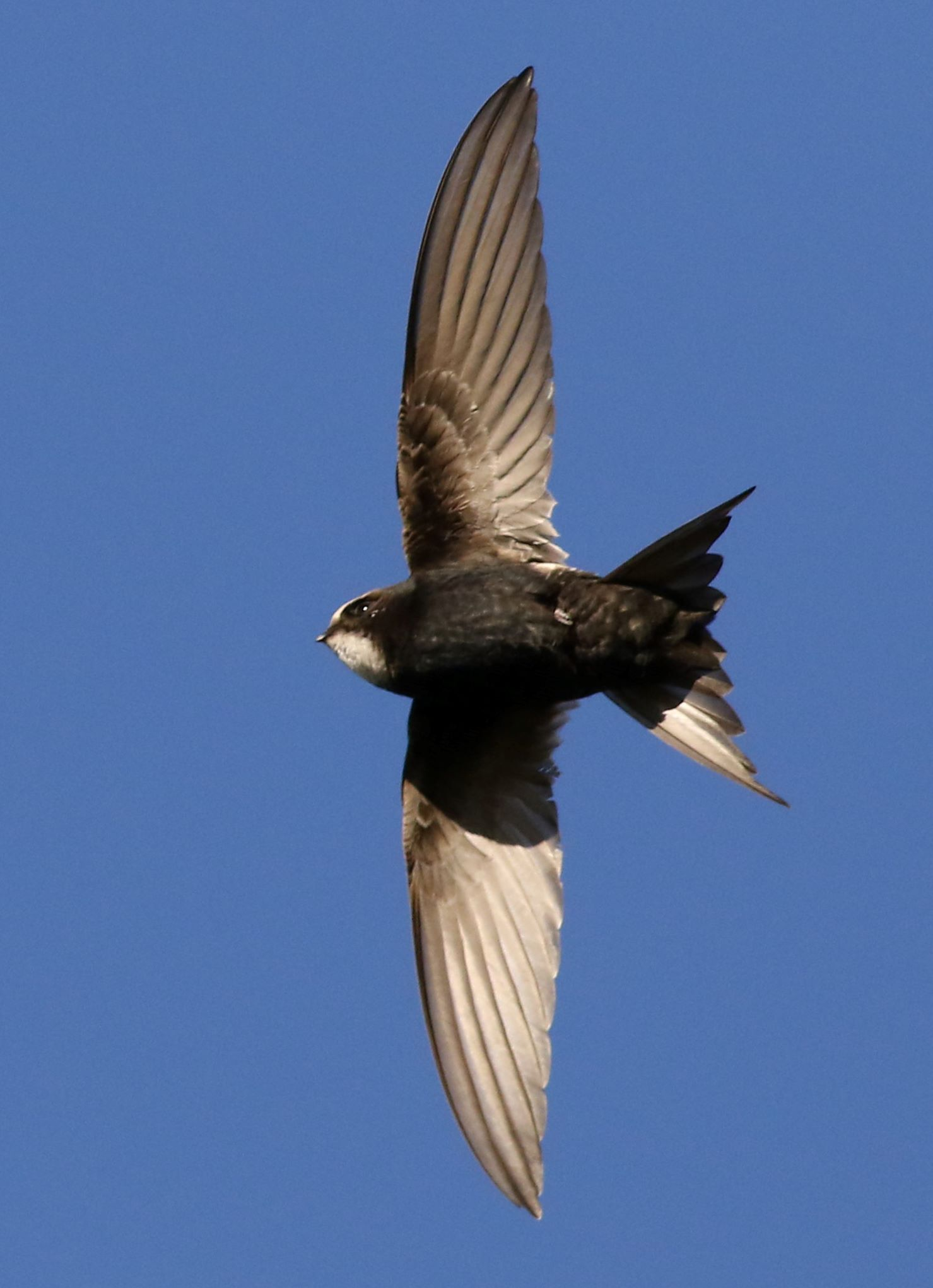
