= Eustathiidae =

Scientific classification
- Kingdom: Animalia
- Phylum: Arthropoda
- Subphylum: Chelicerata
- Class: Arachnida
- Order: Sarcoptiformes
- Suborder: Astigmata
- Superfamily: Pterolichoidea
- Family: Eustathiidae; Oudemans, 1905

Family of mites

Eustathiidae is a family of mites belonging to the order Sarcoptiformes.

Genera:

- Adelocaulus Peterson, Atyeo & Moss, 1980
- Alleustathia Gaud & Atyeo, 1967
- Cerceustathia Peterson, Atyeo & Moss, 1980
- Chaetureustathia Peterson, Atyeo & Moss, 1980
- Chauliacia Oudemans, 1905
- Echineustathia Gaud & McDaniel, 1969
- Elaphocaulus Peterson, Atyeo & Moss, 1980
- Eustathia Oudemans, 1905
- Glosseustathia Peterson, Atyeo & Moss, 1980
- Leptolichus Gaud & Atyeo, 1967
- Microchelys Trouessart, 1916
- Mimeustathia Peterson, Atyeo & Moss, 1980
- Neochauliacia Gaud & Atyeo, 1967
- Odonteustathia Gaud & Atyeo, 1967
- Phoceustathia Peterson, Atyeo & Moss, 1980
- Psepheustathia Peterson, Atyeo & Moss, 1980
- Rhadineustathia Peterson, Atyeo & Moss, 1980
