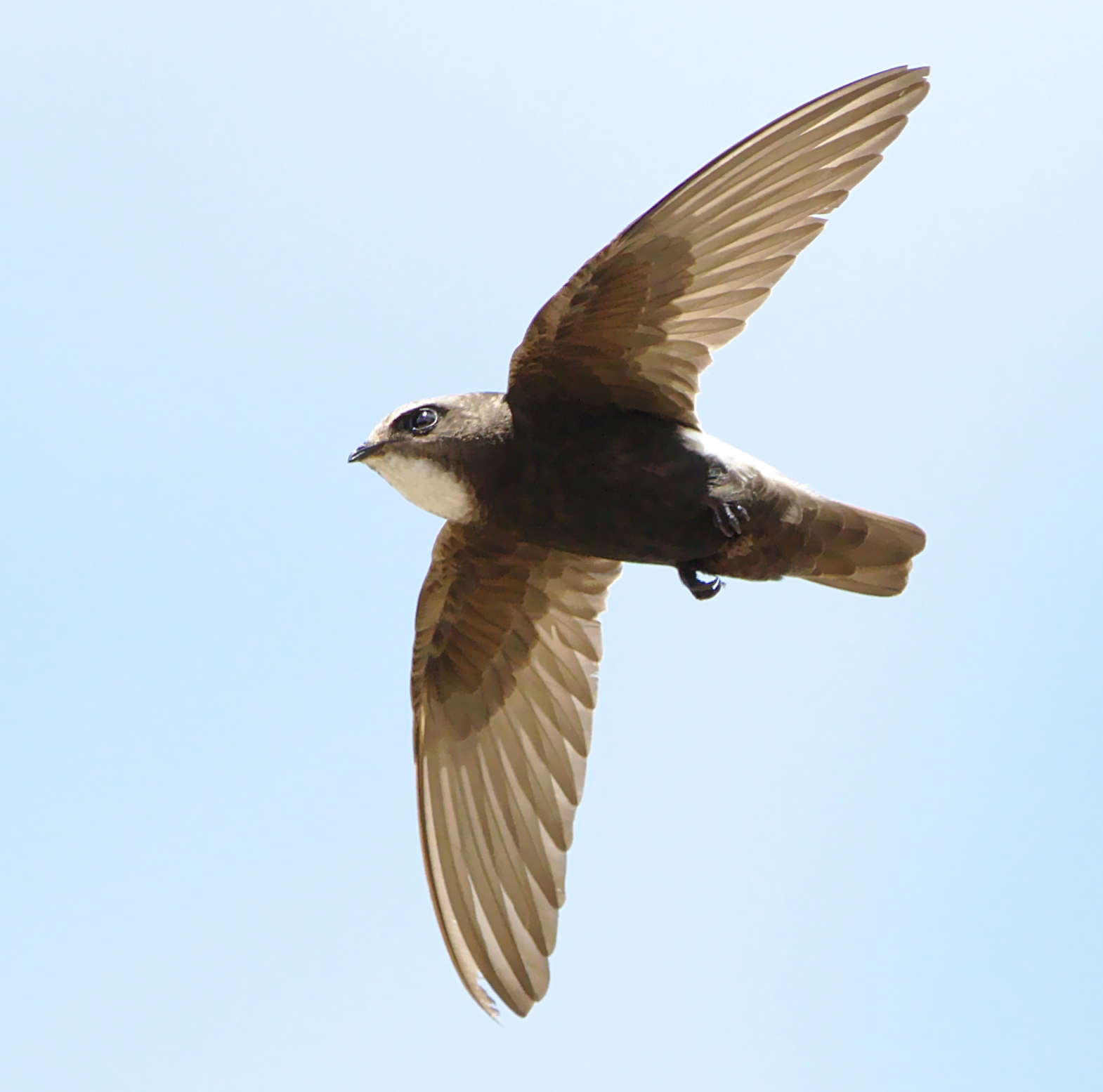
- In South Africa

Conservation status
- Least Concern (IUCN 3.1)

Scientific classification
- Kingdom: Animalia
- Phylum: Chordata
- Class: Aves
- Order: Apodiformes
- Family: Apodidae
- Genus: Apus
- Species: A. affinis

Binomial name
- Apus affinis (JE Gray, 1830)
- Range Breeding range Resident year-round

= Little swift =

Species of bird

The little swift (Apus affinis) is a small species of swift found in Africa and southwestern Asia, and are vagrants and local breeders in southern Europe. They are found both in urban areas and at rocky cliffs where they build nests in a way typical of all members of the order Apodiformes. The genus name Apus is Latin for a swift, thought by the ancients to be a type of swallow without feet (from Ancient Greek α, a, "without", and πούς, pous, "foot"). The Latin specific affinis means similar to or related to, but in this case the species that the little swift supposedly resembles is not clear from the description. The eastern subspecies of little swift have sometime been considered as a separated species, the house swift (Apus nipalensis).

== Taxonomy ==
The little swift was given the binomial name Cypselus affinis in 1830 by the English zoologist John Edward Gray. The bird was illustrated by a lithograph produced by Benjamin Waterhouse Hawkins based on a specimen, or possible a drawing, provided by Thomas Hardwicke. Hardwicke had spent many years working in India for the East India Company. Gray did not specify a locality in India but in 1827 E. C. Stuart Baker restricted the locality to Cawnpore (now Kanpur) in the state of Uttar Pradesh. The specific epithet affinis is Latin meaning "related", "allied" or "neighbourly". The little swift is now one of 15 species placed in the genus Apus.

Ten subspecies are recognised:

- A. a. galilejensis (Antinori, 1855) – northern and sub-Saharan Africa and eastward to Pakistan
- A. a. bannermani Hartert, 1928 – Bioko, Príncipe, and São Tomé (Gulf of Guinea)
- A. a. aerobates Brooke, 1969 – southwestern Mauritania to Ethiopia, Somalia, central Angola, and South Africa
- A. a. theresae Meinertzhagen, 1949 – western and southern Angola to southern Zambia and South Africa
- A. a. affinis (Gray, 1830) – southern Somalia to northern Mozambique, Pemba Island, and Zanzibar, to India
- A. a. singalensis Madarász, 1911 – southern India and Sri Lanka
- A. a. nipalensis (Hodgson, 1837) – Nepal through Myanmar, Thailand, Indochina, southeastern China, southern Japan (central Honshu to Ryukyu Islands), and Philippines
- A. a. subfurcatus (Blyth, 1849) – Malayan Peninsula to Borneo, Sumatra, and adjacent islands; possibly Sulawesi and Moluccas
- A. a. furcatus Brooke, 1971 – Java and Bali; possibly Lesser Sunda Islands
- A. a. kuntzi Deignan, 1958 – Taiwan

== Description ==
Little swifts are readily identified by their small size. Their wingspan is only 33 cm compared to 42 cm in the case of common swift. Their plumage is black except for a white throat and rump, the white rump patch extending onto the flanks. They have a short square tail, with all rectrices round-tipped. The flight is fluttering like that of a house martin, and the call is a high twittering. Like other swifts they are very short-legged. The legs are used for clinging to vertical surfaces only.

== Habits and foraging ==
Little swifts spend most of their lives in the air, living on the insects they catch in their beaks. They drink on the wing, but roost on vertical cliffs or walls. They never settle voluntarily on the ground.

== Movements ==
Unlike the more northerly common swift, many birds are resident, but some populations are migratory, and these winter further south than their breeding areas. They wander widely on migration, and are seen as rare vagrants in much of Europe and Asia.

== Breeding ==
Little swifts breed around habitation and cliffs from southern Spain, Africa northeastwards through southern Pakistan and India and Sri Lanka. They build their nests in holes in buildings or sometimes on cliffs, laying 1–4 eggs. A little swift will return to the same site year after year, rebuilding its nest when necessary. A species of bedbug Cimex hemipterus has been recorded from its nest in India.

== Status ==
This species has a wide distribution and its population is increasing, and as a result is classified as "Least Concern" by the International Union for Conservation of Nature and Natural Resources.

The population of the species is expanding and increasing, mainly due to its tendency to build nests in man-made structures. However, in Turkey a local decline of about 50% was observed due to habitat loss resulting from dam construction.

== Gallery ==
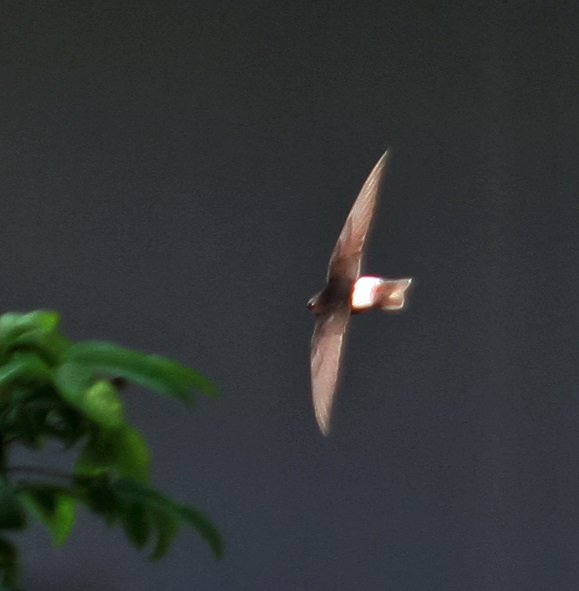
Dorsal view in India – displaying the square, white rump patch

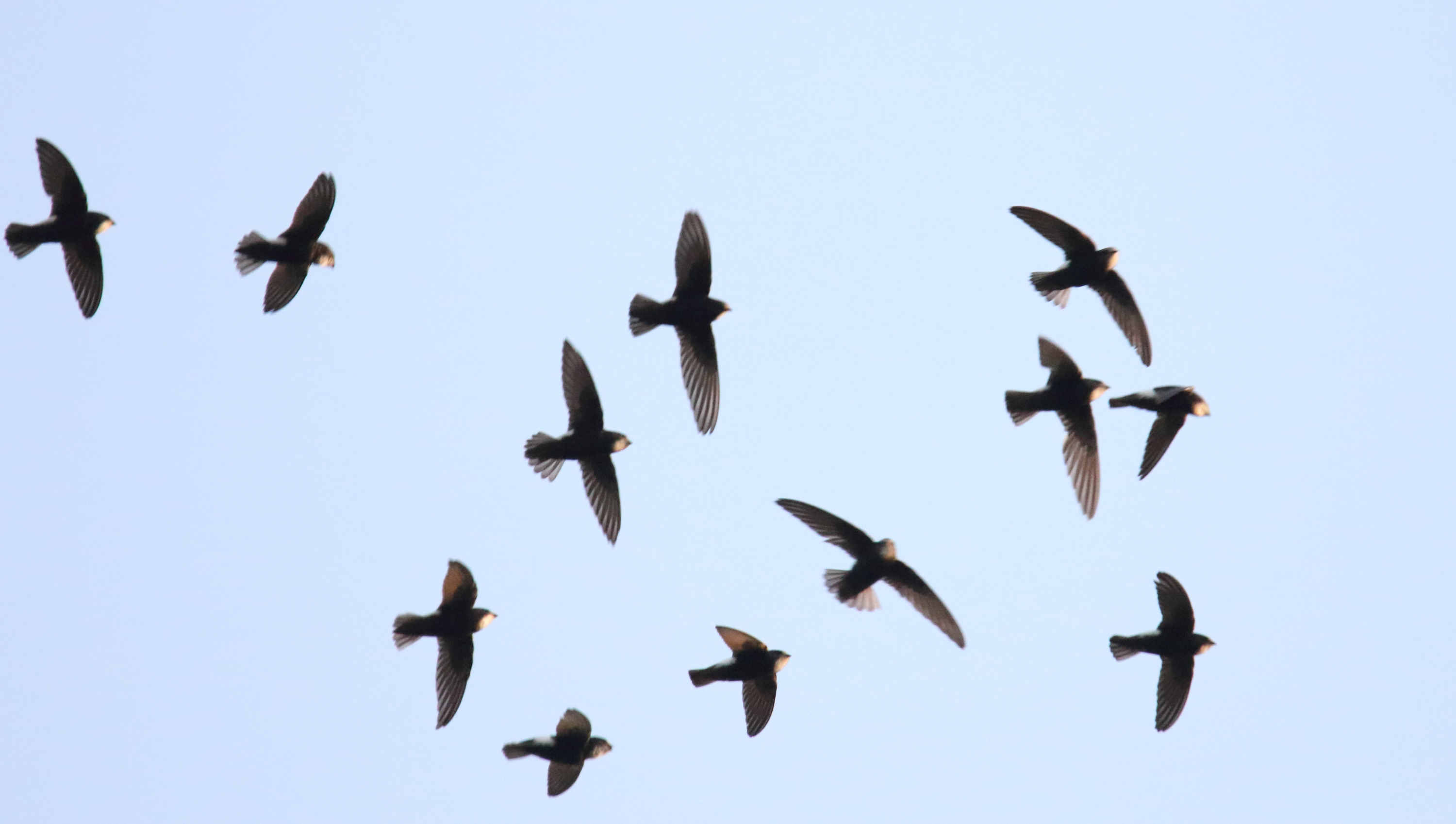
A flock assembling at dusk in Tanzania

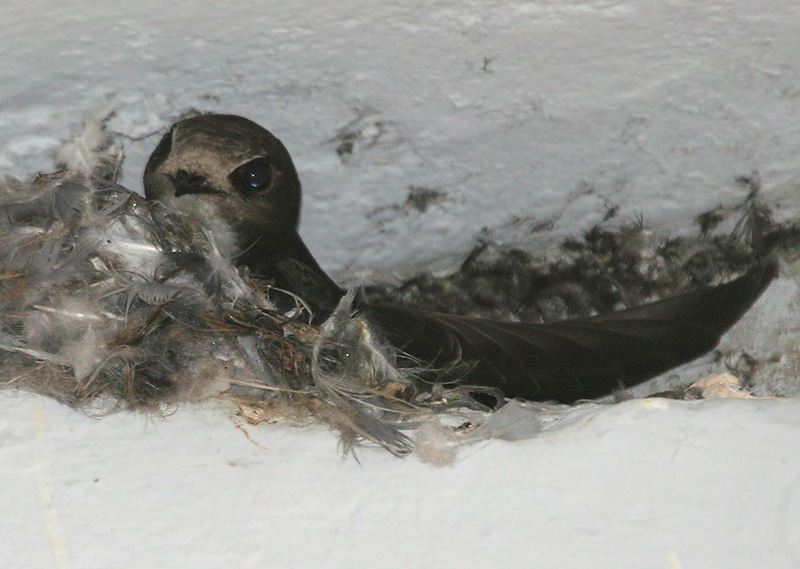
Nesting in Hyderabad, India

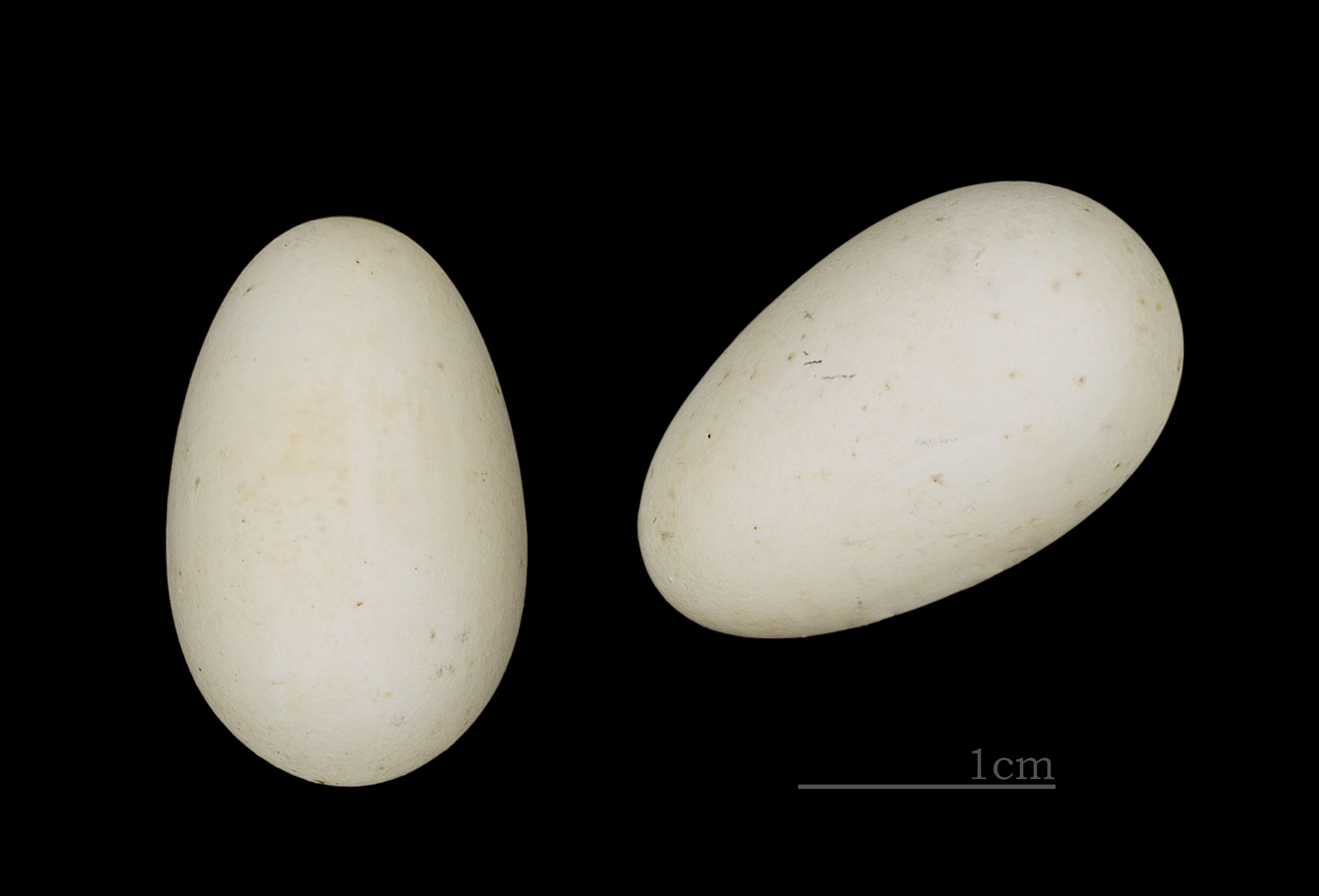
Eggs of Apus affinis
