= List of honeyguides =

Honeyguides are birds in the family Indicatoridae in the order Piciformes. There are currently 16 extant species of honeyguides recognised by the International Ornithologists' Union.

== Conventions ==
IUCN Red List categories
Conservation status
- EX: Extinct (0 species)
- EW: Extinct in the wild (0 species)
- CR: Critically endangered (0 species)
- EN: Endangered (0 species)
- VU: Vulnerable (0 species)
- NT: Near threatened (3 species)
- LC: Least concern (13 species)

Conservation status codes listed follow the International Union for Conservation of Nature (IUCN) Red List of Threatened Species. Range maps are provided wherever possible; if a range map is not available, a description of the honeyguide's range is provided. Ranges are based on the IOC World Bird List for that species unless otherwise noted. Population estimates are of the number of mature individuals and are taken from the IUCN Red List.

This list follows the taxonomic treatment (designation and order of species) and nomenclature (scientific and common names) of version 13.2 of the IOC World Bird List. Where the taxonomy proposed by the IOC World Bird List conflicts with the taxonomy followed by the IUCN (Note: The IUCN follows the taxonomy proposed by the HBW and BirdLife Taxonomic Checklist.) or the 2023 edition of The Clements Checklist of Birds of the World, the disagreement is noted next to the species's common name (for nomenclatural disagreements) or scientific name (for taxonomic disagreements).

== Classification ==
The International Ornithologists' Union (IOU) recognises 16 species of honeyguides in four genera. This list does not include hybrid species, extinct prehistoric species, or putative species not yet accepted by the IOU.

Family Indicatoridae

- Genus Prodotiscus: three species
- Genus Melignomon: two species
- Genus Indicator: ten species
- Genus Melichneutes: one species

== Honeyguides ==
Genus Prodotiscus – Sundevall, 1850 – 3 species
Common name	Scientific name and subspecies	Range	IUCN status and estimated population
Cassin's honeybird	P. insignis (Cassin, 1856) Two subspecies: P. i. flavodorsalis; P. i. insignis	West and Central Africa	LC Unknown
Green-backed honeybird	P. zambesiae Shelley, 1894 Three subspecies: P. z. ellenbecki; P. z. zambesiae; P. z. lathburyi	Southern and East Africa	LC Unknown
Brown-backed honeybird	P. regulus Sundevall, 1850 Two subspecies: P. r. camerunensis; P. r. regulus	Widely throughout Africa	LC Unknown

Genus Melignomon – Reichenow, 1898 – 2 species
Common name	Scientific name and subspecies	Range	IUCN status and estimated population
Zenker's honeyguide	M. zenkeri Reichenow, 1898	Central Africa	LC Unknown
Yellow-footed honeyguide	M. eisentrauti Louette, 1981	West and Central Africa	NT Unknown

Genus Indicator – Stephens, 1815 – 10 species
Common name	Scientific name and subspecies	Range	IUCN status and estimated population
Dwarf honeyguide	I. pumilio Chapin, 1958	Central Africa	LC Unknown
Willcock's honeyguide	I. willcocksi Alexander, 1901 Three subspecies: I. w. ansorgei; I. w. willcocksi; I. w. hutsoni	West and Central Africa	LC Unknown
Pallid honeyguide	I. meliphilus (Oberholser, 1905) Two subspecies: I. m. meliphilus; I. m. angolensis	Southern and East Africa	LC Unknown
Least honeyguide	I. exilis (Cassin, 1856) Three subspecies: I. e. poensis; I. e. exilis; I. e. pachyrhynchus	West and Central Africa	LC Unknown
Lesser honeyguide	I. minor Stephens, 1815 Eight subspecies: I. m. ussheri; I. m. conirostris; I. m. senegalensis; I. m. riggenbachi; I. m. diadematus; I. m. teitensis; I. m. damarensis; I. m. minor	Widely throughout Africa	LC Unknown
Spotted honeyguide	I. maculatus Gray, G. R., 1847 Two subspecies: I. m. maculatus; I. m. stictithorax	West and Central Africa	LC Unknown
Scaly-throated honeyguide	I. variegatus Lesson, R. P., 1830	Central Africa	LC Unknown
Yellow-rumped honeyguide	I. xanthonotus Blyth, 1842 Two subspecies: I. x. radcliffii; I. x. xanthonotus	Northwestern India to northern Myanmar	NT Unknown
Malaysian honeyguide	I. archipelagicus Temminck, 1832	Malay Peninsula, Borneo, and Sumatra	NT Unknown
Greater honeyguide	I. indicator (Sparrman, 1777)	Widely throughout Africa	LC Unknown

Genus Melichneutes – Reichenow, 1910 – 1 species
Common name	Scientific name and subspecies	Range	IUCN status and estimated population
Lyre-tailed honeyguide	M. robustus (Bates, 1909)	West and Central Africa	LC Unknown
