= List of birds of Guinea-Bissau =

This is a list of the bird species recorded in Guinea-Bissau. The avifauna of Guinea-Bissau include a total of 547 species.

This list's taxonomic treatment (designation and sequence of orders, families and species) and nomenclature (common and scientific names) follow the conventions of The Clements Checklist of Birds of the World, 2022 edition. The family accounts at the beginning of each heading reflect this taxonomy, as do the species counts found in each family account. Accidental species are included in the total species count for Guinea-Bissau.

The following tag has been used to highlight accidentals. The commonly occurring native species are untagged.

- (A) Accidental - a species that rarely or accidentally occurs in Guinea-Bissau
- (I) Introduced - a species introduced to Guinea-Bissau as a consequence, direct or indirect, of human actions

== Ducks, geese, and waterfowl ==
Order: Anseriformes Family: Anatidae

Anatidae includes the ducks and most duck-like waterfowl, such as geese and swans. These birds are adapted to an aquatic existence with webbed feet, flattened bills, and feathers that are excellent at shedding water due to an oily coating.

- White-faced whistling-duck, Dendrocygna viduata
- White-backed duck, Thalassornis leuconotus
- Knob-billed duck, Sarkidiornis melanotos
- Egyptian goose, Alopochen aegyptiacus
- Spur-winged goose, Plectropterus gambensis
- African pygmy-goose, Nettapus auritus
- Garganey, Spatula querquedula
- Northern shoveler, Spatula clypeata
- Eurasian wigeon, Mareca penelope
- Northern pintail, Anas acuta
- Green-winged teal, Anas crecca

== Guineafowl ==
Order: Galliformes Family: Numididae

Guineafowl are a group of African, seed-eating, ground-nesting birds that resemble partridges, but with featherless heads and spangled grey plumage.

- Helmeted guineafowl, Numida meleagris
- Western crested guineafowl, Guttera verreauxi

== New World quail ==
Order: Galliformes Family: Odontophoridae

Despite their family's common name, this species and one other are native to Africa.

- Stone partridge, Ptilopachus petrosus

== Pheasants, grouse, and allies ==
Order: Galliformes Family: Phasianidae

The Phasianidae are a family of terrestrial birds which consists of quails, snowcocks, francolins, spurfowls, tragopans, monals, pheasants, peafowls and jungle fowls. In general, they are plump (although they vary in size) and have broad, relatively short wings.

- White-throated francolin, Campocolinus albogularis (A)
- Common quail, Coturnix coturnix (A)
- Ahanta francolin, Pternistis ahantensis
- Double-spurred francolin, Pternistis bicalcaratus

== Flamingos ==
Order: Phoenicopteriformes Family: Phoenicopteridae

Flamingos are gregarious wading birds, usually 3 to 5 feet (0.9 to 1.5 m) tall, found in both the Western and Eastern Hemispheres. Flamingos filter-feed on shellfish and algae. Their oddly shaped beaks are specially adapted to separate mud and silt from the food they consume and, uniquely, are used upside-down.

- Greater flamingo, Phoenicopterus roseus
- Lesser flamingo, Phoenicopterus minor

== Grebes ==
Order: Podicipediformes Family: Podicipedidae

Grebes are small to medium-large freshwater diving birds. They have lobed toes and are excellent swimmers and divers. However, they have their feet placed far back on the body, making them quite ungainly on land.

- Little grebe, Tachybaptus ruficollis

== Pigeons and doves ==
Order: Columbiformes Family: Columbidae

Pigeons and doves are stout-bodied birds with short necks and short slender bills with a fleshy cere.

- Rock pigeon, Columba livia (I)
- Speckled pigeon, Columba guinea
- Afep pigeon, Columba unicincta (A)
- European turtle-dove, Streptopelia turtur
- Adamawa turtle-dove, Streptopelia hypopyrrha
- African collared-dove, Streptopelia roseogrisea (A)
- Mourning collared-dove, Streptopelia decipiens
- Red-eyed dove, Streptopelia semitorquata
- Vinaceous dove, Streptopelia vinacea
- Laughing dove, Streptopelia senegalensis
- Black-billed wood-dove, Turtur abyssinicus
- Blue-spotted wood-dove, Turtur afer
- Tambourine dove, Turtur tympanistria
- Namaqua dove, Oena capensis
- Bruce's green-pigeon, Treron waalia
- African green-pigeon, Treron calva

== Sandgrouse ==
Order: Pterocliformes Family: Pteroclidae

Sandgrouse have small, pigeon like heads and necks, but sturdy compact bodies. They have long pointed wings and sometimes tails and a fast direct flight. Flocks fly to watering holes at dawn and dusk. Their legs are feathered down to the toes.

- Four-banded sandgrouse, Pterocles quadricinctus

== Bustards ==
Order: Otidiformes Family: Otididae

Bustards are large terrestrial birds mainly associated with dry open country and steppes in the Old World. They are omnivorous and nest on the ground. They walk steadily on strong legs and big toes, pecking for food as they go. They have long broad wings with "fingered" wingtips and striking patterns in flight. Many have interesting mating displays.

- Denham's bustard, Neotis denhami
- White-bellied bustard, Eupodotis senegalensis
- Black-bellied bustard, Lissotis melanogaster

== Turacos ==
Order: Musophagiformes Family: Musophagidae

The turacos, plantain eaters and go-away-birds make up the bird family Musophagidae. They are medium-sized arboreal birds. The turacos and plantain eaters are brightly coloured, usually in blue, green or purple. The go-away birds are mostly grey and white.

- Great blue turaco, Corythaeola cristata
- Guinea turaco, Tauraco persa
- Violet turaco, Musophaga violacea
- Western plantain-eater, Crinifer piscator

== Cuckoos ==
Order: Cuculiformes Family: Cuculidae

The family Cuculidae includes cuckoos, roadrunners and anis. These birds are of variable size with slender bodies, long tails and strong legs. The Old World cuckoos are brood parasites.

- Black-throated coucal, Centropus leucogaster
- Senegal coucal, Centropus senegalensis
- Blue-headed coucal, Centropus monachus
- Black coucal, Centropus grillii
- Blue malkoha, Ceuthmochares aereus
- Great spotted cuckoo, Clamator glandarius
- Levaillant's cuckoo, Clamator levaillantii
- Pied cuckoo, Clamator jacobinus
- Thick-billed cuckoo, Pachycoccyx audeberti (A)
- Dideric cuckoo, Chrysococcyx caprius
- Klaas's cuckoo, Chrysococcyx klaas
- African emerald cuckoo, Chrysococcyx cupreus
- Black cuckoo, Cuculus clamosus
- Red-chested cuckoo, Cuculus solitarius
- African cuckoo, Cuculus gularis
- Common cuckoo, Cuculus canorus

== Nightjars and allies ==
Order: Caprimulgiformes Family: Caprimulgidae

Nightjars are medium-sized nocturnal birds that usually nest on the ground. They have long wings, short legs and very short bills. Most have small feet, of little use for walking, and long pointed wings. Their soft plumage is camouflaged to resemble bark or leaves.

- Pennant-winged nightjar, Caprimulgus vexillarius
- Standard-winged nightjar, Caprimulgus longipennis
- Red-necked nightjar, Caprimulgus ruficollis
- Eurasian nightjar, Caprimulgus europaeus
- Fiery-necked nightjar, Caprimulgus pectoralis
- Plain nightjar, Caprimulgus inornatus
- Long-tailed nightjar, Caprimulgus climacurus

== Swifts ==
Order: Caprimulgiformes Family: Apodidae

Swifts are small birds which spend the majority of their lives flying. These birds have very short legs and never settle voluntarily on the ground, perching instead only on vertical surfaces. Many swifts have long swept-back wings which resemble a crescent or boomerang.

- Mottled spinetail, Telacanthura ussheri
- Common swift, Apus apus
- Pallid swift, Apus pallidus
- Little swift, Apus affinis
- White-rumped swift, Apus caffer
- African palm-swift, Cypsiurus parvus

== Flufftails ==
Order: Gruiformes Family: Sarothruridae

The flufftails are a small family of ground-dwelling birds found only in Madagascar and sub-Saharan Africa.

- White-spotted flufftail, Sarothrura pulchra

== Rails, gallinules and coots ==
Order: Gruiformes Family: Rallidae

Rallidae is a large family of small to medium-sized birds which includes the rails, crakes, coots and gallinules. Typically they inhabit dense vegetation in damp environments near lakes, swamps or rivers. In general they are shy and secretive birds, making them difficult to observe. Most species have strong legs and long toes which are well adapted to soft uneven surfaces. They tend to have short, rounded wings and to be weak fliers.

- African crake, Crex egregia
- Eurasian moorhen, Gallinula chloropus
- Allen's gallinule, Porphyrio alleni
- African swamphen, Porphyrio madagascariensis
- Black crake, Zapornia flavirostris
- Little crake, Zapornia parva
- Baillon's crake, Zapornia pusilla

== Finfoots ==
Order: Gruiformes Family: Heliornithidae

Heliornithidae is a small family of tropical birds with webbed lobes on their feet similar to those of grebes and coots.

- African finfoot, Podica senegalensis (A)

== Cranes ==
Order: Gruiformes Family: Gruidae

Cranes are large, long-legged and long-necked birds. Unlike the similar-looking but unrelated herons, cranes fly with necks outstretched, not pulled back. Most have elaborate and noisy courting displays or "dances".

- Black crowned-crane, Balearica pavonina
- Common crane, Grus grus

== Thick-knees ==
Order: Charadriiformes Family: Burhinidae

The thick-knees are a group of largely tropical waders in the family Burhinidae. They are found worldwide within the tropical zone, with some species also breeding in temperate Europe and Australia. They are medium to large waders with strong black or yellow-black bills, large yellow eyes and cryptic plumage. Despite being classed as waders, most species have a preference for arid or semi-arid habitats.

- Senegal thick-knee, Burhinus senegalensis
- Spotted thick-knee, Burhinus capensis (A)

== Egyptian plover ==
Order: Charadriiformes Family: Pluvianidae

The Egyptian plover is found across equatorial Africa and along the Nile River.

- Egyptian plover, Pluvianus aegyptius

== Stilts and avocets ==
Order: Charadriiformes Family: Recurvirostridae

Recurvirostridae is a family of large wading birds, which includes the avocets and stilts. The avocets have long legs and long up-curved bills. The stilts have extremely long legs and long, thin, straight bills.

- Black-winged stilt, Himantopus himantopus
- Pied avocet, Recurvirostra avosetta

== Oystercatchers ==
Order: Charadriiformes Family: Haematopodidae

The oystercatchers are large and noisy plover-like birds, with strong bills used for smashing or prising open molluscs.

- Eurasian oystercatcher, Haematopus ostralegus

== Plovers and lapwings ==
Order: Charadriiformes Family: Charadriidae

The family Charadriidae includes the plovers, dotterels and lapwings. They are small to medium-sized birds with compact bodies, short, thick necks and long, usually pointed, wings. They are found in open country worldwide, mostly in habitats near water.

- Black-bellied plover, Pluvialis squatarola
- Spur-winged lapwing, Vanellus spinosus
- Black-headed lapwing, Vanellus tectus
- White-headed lapwing, Vanellus albiceps
- Senegal lapwing, Vanellus lugubris
- Wattled lapwing, Vanellus senegallus
- Kittlitz's plover, Charadrius pecuarius
- Kentish plover, Charadrius alexandrinus
- Common ringed plover, Charadrius hiaticula
- Little ringed plover, Charadrius dubius
- Forbes's plover, Charadrius forbesi
- White-fronted plover, Charadrius marginatus

== Painted-snipes ==
Order: Charadriiformes Family: Rostratulidae

Painted-snipes are short-legged, long-billed birds similar in shape to the true snipes, but more brightly coloured.

- Greater painted-snipe, Rostratula benghalensis

== Jacanas ==
Order: Charadriiformes Family: Jacanidae

The jacanas are a group of tropical waders in the family Jacanidae. They are found throughout the tropics. They are identifiable by their huge feet and claws which enable them to walk on floating vegetation in the shallow lakes that are their preferred habitat.

- Lesser jacana, Microparra capensis (A)
- African jacana, Actophilornis africanus

== Sandpipers and allies ==
Order: Charadriiformes Family: Scolopacidae

Scolopacidae is a large diverse family of small to medium-sized shorebirds including the sandpipers, curlews, godwits, shanks, tattlers, woodcocks, snipes, dowitchers, and phalaropes. The majority of these species eat small invertebrates picked out of the mud or soil. Variation in length of legs and bills enables multiple species to feed in the same habitat, particularly on the coast, without direct competition for food.

- Whimbrel, Numenius phaeopus
- Eurasian curlew, Numenius arquata
- Bar-tailed godwit, Limosa lapponica
- Black-tailed godwit, Limosa limosa
- Ruddy turnstone, Arenaria interpres
- Red knot, Calidris canutus
- Ruff, Calidris pugnax
- Curlew sandpiper, Calidris ferruginea
- Temminck's stint, Calidris temminckii
- Sanderling, Calidris alba
- Dunlin, Calidris alpina
- Little stint, Calidris minuta
- Jack snipe, Lymnocryptes minimus
- Great snipe, Gallinago media
- Common snipe, Gallinago gallinago
- Red phalarope, Phalaropus fulicarius
- Common sandpiper, Actitis hypoleucos
- Green sandpiper, Tringa ochropus
- Spotted redshank, Tringa erythropus
- Common greenshank, Tringa nebularia
- Marsh sandpiper, Tringa stagnatilis
- Wood sandpiper, Tringa glareola
- Common redshank, Tringa totanus

== Buttonquail ==
Order: Charadriiformes Family: Turnicidae

The buttonquail are small, drab, running birds which resemble the true quails. The female is the brighter of the sexes and initiates courtship. The male incubates the eggs and tends the young.

- Small buttonquail, Turnix sylvaticus

== Pratincoles and coursers ==
Order: Charadriiformes Family: Glareolidae

Glareolidae is a family of wading birds comprising the pratincoles, which have short legs, long pointed wings, and long forked tails, and the coursers, which have long legs, short wings, and long, pointed bills which curve downwards.

- Temminck's courser, Cursorius temminckii
- Bronze-winged courser, Rhinoptilus chalcopterus
- Collared pratincole, Glareola pratincola
- Rock pratincole, Glareola nuchalis (A)

== Skuas and jaegers ==
Order: Charadriiformes Family: Stercorariidae

The family Stercorariidae are, in general, medium to large birds, typically with grey or brown plumage, often with white markings on the wings. They nest on the ground in temperate and arctic regions and are long-distance migrants.

- Pomarine jaeger, Stercorarius pomarinus (A)
- Parasitic jaeger, Stercorarius parasiticus

== Gulls, terns, and skimmers ==
Order: Charadriiformes Family: Laridae

Laridae is a family of medium to large seabirds, the gulls, terns, and skimmers. They are typically grey or white, often with black markings on the head or wings. They have stout, longish bills and webbed feet. Terns are a group of generally medium to large seabirds typically with grey or white plumage, often with black markings on the head. Most terns hunt fish by diving but some pick insects off the surface of fresh water. Terns are generally long-lived birds, with several species known to live in excess of 30 years.

- Sabine's gull, Xema sabini
- Slender-billed gull, Chroicocephalus genei (A)
- Gray-hooded gull, Chroicocephalus cirrocephalus
- Black-headed gull, Chroicocephalus ridibundus (A)
- Lesser black-backed gull, Larus fuscus
- Kelp gull, Larus dominicanus (A)
- Brown noddy, Anous stolidus (A)
- Black noddy, Anous minutus
- Sooty tern, Onychoprion fuscatus
- Bridled tern, Onychoprion anaethetus
- Little tern, Sternula albifrons
- Gull-billed tern, Gelochelidon nilotica
- Caspian tern, Hydroprogne caspia
- Black tern, Chlidonias niger
- White-winged tern, Chlidonias leucopterus
- Whiskered tern, Chlidonias hybrida
- Roseate tern, Sterna dougallii
- Common tern, Sterna hirundo
- Arctic tern, Sterna paradisaea
- Sandwich tern, Thalasseus sandvicensis
- Lesser crested tern, Thalasseus bengalensis
- West African crested tern, Thalasseus albididorsalis
- African skimmer, Rynchops flavirostris (A)

== Southern storm-petrels ==
Order: Procellariiformes Family: Oceanitidae

The austral storm petrels are relatives of the petrels and are the smallest seabirds. They feed on planktonic crustaceans and small fish picked from the surface, typically while hovering.

- Wilson's storm-petrel, Oceanites oceanicus

== Northern storm-petrels ==
Order: Procellariiformes Family: Hydrobatidae

Though the members of this family are similar in many respects to the southern storm-petrels, including their general appearance and habits, there are enough genetic differences to warrant their placement in a separate family.

- European storm-petrel, Hydrobates pelagicus

== Shearwaters and petrels ==
Order: Procellariiformes Family: Procellariidae

The procellariids are the main group of medium-sized "true petrels", characterised by united nostrils with medium septum and a long outer functional primary.

- Fea's petrel, Pterodroma feae
- Cory's shearwater, Calonectris diomedea
- Manx shearwater, Puffinus puffinus
- Balearic shearwater, Puffinus mauretanicus
- Boyd's shearwater, Puffinus boydi

== Storks ==
Order: Ciconiiformes Family: Ciconiidae

Storks are large, long-legged, long-necked, wading birds with long, stout bills. Storks are mute, but bill-clattering is an important mode of communication at the nest. Their nests can be large and may be reused for many years. Many species are migratory.

- Black stork, Ciconia nigra
- African woolly-necked stork, Ciconia microscelis
- White stork, Ciconia ciconia
- Saddle-billed stork, Ephippiorhynchus senegalensis
- Marabou stork, Leptoptilos crumenifer
- Yellow-billed stork, Mycteria ibis

== Boobies and gannets ==
Order: Suliformes Family: Sulidae

The sulids comprise the gannets and boobies. Both groups are medium to large coastal seabirds that plunge-dive for fish.

- Northern gannet, Morus bassanus
- Brown booby, Sula leucogaster

== Darters ==
Order: Suliformes Family: Anhingidae

Darters are often called "snake-birds" because of their long thin neck, which gives a snake-like appearance when they swim with their bodies submerged. The males have black and dark-brown plumage, an erectile crest on the nape and a larger bill than the female. The females have much paler plumage especially on the neck and underparts. The darters have completely webbed feet and their legs are short and set far back on the body. Their plumage is somewhat permeable, like that of cormorants, and they spread their wings to dry after diving.

- African darter, Anhinga rufa

== Cormorants ==
Order: Suliformes Family: Phalacrocoracidae

Phalacrocoracidae is a family of medium to large coastal, fish-eating seabirds that includes cormorants and shags. Plumage colouration varies, with the majority having mainly dark plumage, some species being black-and-white and a few being colourful.

- Long-tailed cormorant, Microcarbo africanus
- Great cormorant, Phalacrocorax carbo

== Pelicans ==
Order: Pelecaniformes Family: Pelecanidae

Pelicans are large water birds with a distinctive pouch under their beak. As with other members of the order Pelecaniformes, they have webbed feet with four toes.

- Great white pelican, Pelecanus onocrotalus
- Pink-backed pelican, Pelecanus rufescens

== Hammerkop ==
Order: Pelecaniformes Family: Scopidae

The hammerkop is a medium-sized bird with a long shaggy crest. The shape of its head with a curved bill and crest at the back is reminiscent of a hammer, hence its name. Its plumage is drab-brown all over.

- Hamerkop, Scopus umbretta

== Herons, egrets, and bitterns ==
Order: Pelecaniformes Family: Ardeidae

The family Ardeidae contains the bitterns, herons, and egrets. Herons and egrets are medium to large wading birds with long necks and legs. Bitterns tend to be shorter necked and more wary. Members of Ardeidae fly with their necks retracted, unlike other long-necked birds such as storks, ibises, and spoonbills.

- Great bittern, Botaurus stellaris (A)
- Little bittern, Ixobrychus minutus
- Dwarf bittern, Ixobrychus sturmii (A)
- White-crested bittern, Tigriornis leucolophus
- Gray heron, Ardea cinerea
- Black-headed heron, Ardea melanocephala
- Goliath heron, Ardea goliath
- Purple heron, Ardea purpurea
- Great egret, Ardea alba
- Intermediate egret, Ardea intermedia
- Little egret, Egretta garzetta
- Western reef-heron, Egretta gularis
- Black heron, Egretta ardesiaca
- Cattle egret, Bubulcus ibis
- Squacco heron, Ardeola ralloides
- Striated heron, Butorides striata
- Black-crowned night-heron, Nycticorax nycticorax
- White-backed night-heron, Gorsachius leuconotus

== Ibises and spoonbills ==
Order: Pelecaniformes Family: Threskiornithidae

Threskiornithidae is a family of large terrestrial and wading birds which includes the ibises and spoonbills. They have long, broad wings with 11 primary and about 20 secondary feathers. They are strong fliers and despite their size and weight, very capable soarers.

- Glossy ibis, Plegadis falcinellus
- African sacred ibis, Threskiornis aethiopicus
- Hadada ibis, Bostrychia hagedash
- Eurasian spoonbill, Platalea leucorodia (A)
- African spoonbill, Platalea alba

== Secretarybird ==
Order: Accipitriformes Family: Sagittariidae

The secretarybird is a bird of prey in the order Accipitriformes but is easily distinguished from other raptors by its long crane-like legs.

- Secretarybird, Sagittarius serpentarius

== Osprey ==
Order: Accipitriformes Family: Pandionidae

The family Pandionidae contains only one species, the osprey. The osprey is a medium-large raptor which is a specialist fish-eater with a worldwide distribution.

- Osprey, Pandion haliaetus

== Hawks, eagles, and kites ==
Order: Accipitriformes Family: Accipitridae

Accipitridae is a family of birds of prey, which includes hawks, eagles, kites, harriers and Old World vultures. These birds have powerful hooked beaks for tearing flesh from their prey, strong legs, powerful talons and keen eyesight.

- Black-winged kite, Elanus caeruleus
- African harrier-hawk, Polyboroides typus
- Palm-nut vulture, Gypohierax angolensis
- Egyptian vulture, Neophron percnopterus
- European honey-buzzard, Pernis apivorus
- African cuckoo-hawk, Aviceda cuculoides
- White-headed vulture, Trigonoceps occipitalis
- Hooded vulture, Necrosyrtes monachus
- White-backed vulture, Gyps africanus
- Rüppell's griffon, Gyps rueppelli
- Bateleur, Terathopius ecaudatus
- Short-toed snake-eagle, Circaetus gallicus
- Beaudouin's snake-eagle, Circaetus beaudouini
- Brown snake-eagle, Circaetus cinereus
- Banded snake-eagle, Circaetus cinerascens
- Bat hawk, Macheiramphus alcinus
- Crowned eagle, Stephanoaetus coronatus
- Martial eagle, Polemaetus bellicosus
- Long-crested eagle, Lophaetus occipitalis
- Wahlberg's eagle, Hieraaetus wahlbergi
- Booted eagle, Hieraaetus pennatus
- Ayres's hawk-eagle, Hieraaetus ayresii (A)
- Tawny eagle, Aquila rapax
- African hawk-eagle, Aquila spilogaster
- Lizard buzzard, Kaupifalco monogrammicus
- Dark chanting-goshawk, Melierax metabates
- Gabar goshawk, Micronisus gabar
- Grasshopper buzzard, Butastur rufipennis
- Eurasian marsh-harrier, Circus aeruginosus
- Pallid harrier, Circus macrourus
- Montagu's harrier, Circus pygargus
- African goshawk, Accipiter tachiro
- Shikra, Accipiter badius
- Red-thighed sparrowhawk, Accipiter erythropus
- Ovambo sparrowhawk, Accipiter ovampensis (A)
- Black goshawk, Accipiter melanoleucus
- Black kite, Milvus migrans
- African fish-eagle, Haliaeetus vocifer
- Red-necked buzzard, Buteo auguralis

== Barn-owls ==
Order: Strigiformes Family: Tytonidae

Barn-owls are medium to large owls with large heads and characteristic heart-shaped faces. They have long strong legs with powerful talons. There are 16 species worldwide and 1 species which occurs in Guinea-Bissau.

- Western barn owl, Tyto alba

== Owls ==
Order: Strigiformes Family: Strigidae

The typical owls are small to large solitary nocturnal birds of prey. They have large forward-facing eyes and ears, a hawk-like beak and a conspicuous circle of feathers around each eye called a facial disk.

- Eurasian scops-owl, Otus scops
- African scops-owl, Otus senegalensis
- Northern white-faced owl, Ptilopsis leucotis
- Grayish eagle-owl, Bubo cinerascens
- Verreaux's eagle-owl, Bubo lacteus
- Pel's fishing-owl, Scotopelia peli
- Pearl-spotted owlet, Glaucidium perlatum
- African wood-owl, Strix woodfordii
- Short-eared owl, Asio flammeus (A)

== Mousebirds ==
Order: Coliiformes Family: Coliidae

The mousebirds are slender greyish or brown birds with soft, hairlike body feathers and very long thin tails. They are arboreal and scurry through the leaves like rodents in search of berries, fruit and buds. They are acrobatic and can feed upside down. All species have strong claws and reversible outer toes. They also have crests and stubby bills.

- Blue-naped mousebird, Urocolius macrourus

== Trogons ==
Order: Trogoniformes Family: Trogonidae

The family Trogonidae includes trogons and quetzals. Found in tropical woodlands worldwide, they feed on insects and fruit, and their broad bills and weak legs reflect their diet and arboreal habits. Although their flight is fast, they are reluctant to fly any distance. Trogons have soft, often colourful, feathers with distinctive male and female plumage.

- Narina trogon, Apaloderma narina (A)

== Hoopoes ==
Order: Bucerotiformes Family: Upupidae

Hoopoes have black, white and orangey-pink colouring with a large erectile crest on their head.

- Eurasian hoopoe, Upupa epops

== Woodhoopoes and scimitarbills ==
Order: Bucerotiformes Family: Phoeniculidae

The woodhoopoes are related to the kingfishers, rollers and hoopoes. They most resemble the hoopoes with their long curved bills, used to probe for insects, and short rounded wings. However, they differ in that they have metallic plumage, often blue, green or purple, and lack an erectile crest.

- Green woodhoopoe, Phoeniculus purpureus
- Black scimitarbill, Rhinopomastus aterrimus

== Ground-hornbills ==
Order: Bucerotiformes Family: Bucorvidae

The ground-hornbills are terrestrial birds which feed almost entirely on insects, other birds, snakes, and amphibians.

- Abyssinian ground-hornbill, Bucorvus abyssinicus

== Hornbills ==
Order: Bucerotiformes Family: Bucerotidae

Hornbills are a group of birds whose bill is shaped like a cow's horn, but without a twist, sometimes with a casque on the upper mandible. Frequently, the bill is brightly coloured.

- African pied hornbill, Lophoceros fasciatus
- African gray hornbill, Lophoceros nasutus
- Western red-billed hornbill, Tockus kempi
- Yellow-casqued hornbill, Ceratogymna elata
- Piping hornbill, Bycanistes fistulator

== Kingfishers ==
Order: Coraciiformes Family: Alcedinidae

Kingfishers are medium-sized birds with large heads, long, pointed bills, short legs and stubby tails.

- Shining-blue kingfisher, Alcedo quadribrachys
- Malachite kingfisher, Corythornis cristatus
- White-bellied kingfisher, Corythornis leucogaster
- African pygmy kingfisher, Ispidina picta
- Gray-headed kingfisher, Halcyon leucocephala
- Woodland kingfisher, Halcyon senegalensis
- Blue-breasted kingfisher, Halcyon malimbica
- Striped kingfisher, Halcyon chelicuti
- Giant kingfisher, Megaceryle maximus
- Pied kingfisher, Ceryle rudis

== Bee-eaters ==
Order: Coraciiformes Family: Meropidae

The bee-eaters are a group of near passerine birds in the family Meropidae. Most species are found in Africa but others occur in southern Europe, Madagascar, Australia and New Guinea. They are characterised by richly coloured plumage, slender bodies and usually elongated central tail feathers. All are colourful and have long downturned bills and pointed wings, which give them a swallow-like appearance when seen from afar.

- Red-throated bee-eater, Merops bulocki
- Little bee-eater, Merops pusillus
- Swallow-tailed bee-eater, Merops hirundineus
- White-throated bee-eater, Merops albicollis
- African green bee-eater, Merops viridissimus
- Blue-cheeked bee-eater, Merops persicus
- European bee-eater, Merops apiaster
- Northern carmine bee-eater, Merops nubicus

== Rollers ==
Order: Coraciiformes Family: Coraciidae

Rollers resemble crows in size and build, but are more closely related to the kingfishers and bee-eaters. They share the colourful appearance of those groups with blues and browns predominating. The two inner front toes are connected, but the outer toe is not.

- Abyssinian roller, Coracias abyssinica
- Rufous-crowned roller, Coracias naevia
- Blue-bellied roller, Coracias cyanogaster
- Broad-billed roller, Eurystomus glaucurus
- Blue-throated roller, Eurystomus gularis

== African barbets ==
Order: Piciformes Family: Lybiidae

The African barbets are plump birds, with short necks and large heads. They get their name from the bristles which fringe their heavy bills. Most species are brightly coloured.

- Red-rumped tinkerbird, Pogoniulus atroflavus (A)
- Yellow-rumped tinkerbird, Pogoniulus bilineatus
- Yellow-fronted tinkerbird, Pogoniulus chrysoconus
- Vieillot's barbet, Lybius vieilloti
- Double-toothed barbet, Lybius bidentatus
- Bearded barbet, Lybius dubius

== Honeyguides ==
Order: Piciformes Family: Indicatoridae

Honeyguides are among the few birds that feed on wax. They are named for the greater honeyguide which leads traditional honey-hunters to bees' nests and, after the hunters have harvested the honey, feeds on the remaining contents of the hive.

- Willcock's honeyguide, Indicator willcocksi
- Least honeyguide, Indicator exilis
- Lesser honeyguide, Indicator minor
- Spotted honeyguide, Indicator maculatus
- Greater honeyguide, Indicator indicator
- Lyre-tailed honeyguide, Melichneutes robustus

== Woodpeckers ==
Order: Piciformes Family: Picidae

Woodpeckers are small to medium-sized birds with chisel-like beaks, short legs, stiff tails and long tongues used for capturing insects. Some species have feet with two toes pointing forward and two backward, while several species have only three toes. Many woodpeckers have the habit of tapping noisily on tree trunks with their beaks.

- Eurasian wryneck, Jynx torquilla
- Melancholy woodpecker, Chloropicus lugubris (A)
- Cardinal woodpecker, Chloropicus fuscescens
- Brown-backed woodpecker, Chloropicus obsoletus
- African gray woodpecker, Chloropicus goertae
- Brown-eared woodpecker, Campethera caroli
- Buff-spotted woodpecker, Campethera nivosa
- Little green woodpecker, Campethera maculosa
- Fine-spotted woodpecker, Campethera punctuligera
- Golden-tailed woodpecker, Campethera abingoni

== Falcons and caracaras ==
Order: Falconiformes Family: Falconidae

Falconidae is a family of diurnal birds of prey. They differ from hawks, eagles and kites in that they kill with their beaks instead of their talons.

- Lesser kestrel, Falco naumanni
- Eurasian kestrel, Falco tinnunculus
- Fox kestrel, Falco alopex
- Gray kestrel, Falco ardosiaceus
- Red-necked falcon, Falco chicquera
- African hobby, Falco cuvierii
- Lanner falcon, Falco biarmicus
- Peregrine falcon, Falco peregrinus

== Old World parrots ==
Order: Psittaciformes Family: Psittaculidae

Characteristic features of parrots include a strong curved bill, an upright stance, strong legs, and clawed zygodactyl feet. Many parrots are vividly colored, and some are multi-colored. In size they range from 8 cm (3.1 in) to 1 m (3.3 ft) in length. Old World parrots are found from Africa east across south and southeast Asia and Oceania to Australia and New Zealand.

- Rose-ringed parakeet, Psittacula krameri
- Red-headed lovebird, Agapornis pullarius

== African and New World parrots ==
Order: Psittaciformes Family: Psittacidae

Characteristic features of parrots include a strong curved bill, an upright stance, strong legs, and clawed zygodactyl feet. Many parrots are vividly coloured, and some are multi-coloured. In size they range from 8 cm (3.1 in) to 1 m (3.3 ft) in length. Most of the more than 150 species in this family are found in the New World.

- Gray parrot, Psittacus erithacus
- Brown-necked parrot, Poicephalus robustus
- Senegal parrot, Poicephalus senegalus

== African and green broadbills ==
Order: Passeriformes Family: Calyptomenidae

The broadbills are small, brightly coloured birds which feed on fruit and also take insects in flycatcher fashion, snapping their broad bills. Their habitat is canopies of wet forests.

- African broadbill, Smithornis capensis

== Cuckooshrikes ==
Order: Passeriformes Family: Campephagidae

The cuckooshrikes are small to medium-sized passerine birds. They are predominantly greyish with white and black, although some species are brightly coloured.

- White-breasted cuckooshrike, Coracina pectoralis
- Red-shouldered cuckooshrike, Campephaga phoenicea
- Purple-throated cuckooshrike, Campephaga quiscalina (A)

== Old World orioles ==
Order: Passeriformes Family: Oriolidae

The Old World orioles are colourful passerine birds. They are not related to the New World orioles. There are 29 species worldwide and 2 species which occur in Guinea-Bissau.

- Eurasian golden oriole, Oriolus oriolus
- African golden oriole, Oriolus auratus
- Black-winged oriole, Oriolus nigripennis (A)

== Wattle-eyes and batises ==
Order: Passeriformes Family: Platysteiridae

The wattle-eyes, or puffback flycatchers, are small stout passerine birds of the African tropics. They get their name from the brightly coloured fleshy eye decorations found in most species in this group.

- Brown-throated wattle-eye, Platysteira cyanea
- Senegal batis, Batis senegalensis

== Vangas, helmetshrikes, and allies ==
Order: Passeriformes Family: Vangidae

The helmetshrikes are similar in build to the shrikes, but tend to be colourful species with distinctive crests or other head ornaments, such as wattles, from which they get their name.

- White helmetshrike, Prionops plumatus
- Black-and-white shrike-flycatcher, Bias musicus

== Bushshrikes and allies ==
Order: Passeriformes Family: Malaconotidae

Bushshrikes are similar in habits to shrikes, hunting insects and other small prey from a perch on a bush. Although similar in build to the shrikes, these tend to be either colourful species or largely black; some species are quite secretive.

- Brubru, Nilaus afer
- Northern puffback, Dryoscopus gambensis
- Black-crowned tchagra, Tchagra senegala
- Turati's boubou, Laniarius turatii
- Tropical boubou, Laniarius major (A)
- Yellow-crowned gonolek, Laniarius barbarus
- Sulphur-breasted bushshrike, Telophorus sulfureopectus
- Gray-headed bushshrike, Malaconotus blanchoti

== Drongos ==
Order: Passeriformes Family: Dicruridae

The drongos are mostly black or dark grey in colour, sometimes with metallic tints. They have long forked tails, and some Asian species have elaborate tail decorations. They have short legs and sit very upright when perched, like a shrike. They flycatch or take prey from the ground.

- Western square-tailed drongo, Dicrurus occidentalis
- Glossy-backed drongo, Dicrurus divaricatus

== Monarch flycatchers ==
Order: Passeriformes Family: Monarchidae

The monarch flycatchers are small to medium-sized insectivorous passerines which hunt by flycatching.

- Black-headed paradise-flycatcher, Terpsiphone rufiventer
- African paradise-flycatcher, Terpsiphone viridis

== Shrikes ==
Order: Passeriformes Family: Laniidae

Shrikes are passerine birds known for their habit of catching other birds and small animals and impaling the uneaten portions of their bodies on thorns. A typical shrike's beak is hooked, like a bird of prey.

- Emin's shrike, Lanius gubernator
- Great gray shrike, Lanius senator (A)
- Yellow-billed shrike, Lanius corvinus
- Woodchat shrike, Lanius senator (A)

== Crows, jays, and magpies ==
Order: Passeriformes Family: Corvidae

The family Corvidae includes crows, ravens, jays, choughs, magpies, treepies, nutcrackers and ground jays. Corvids are above average in size among the Passeriformes, and some of the larger species show high levels of intelligence.

- Piapiac, Ptilostomus afer
- Pied crow, Corvus albus

== Hyliotas ==
Order: Passeriformes Family: Hyliotidae

The members of this small family, all of genus Hyliota, are birds of the forest canopy. They tend to feed in mixed-species flocks.

- Yellow-bellied hyliota, Hyliota flavigaster

== Fairy flycatchers ==
Order: Passeriformes Family: Stenostiridae

Most of the species of this small family are found in Africa, though a few inhabit tropical Asia. They are not closely related to other birds called "flycatchers".

- African blue flycatcher, Elminia longicauda

== Tits, chickadees, and titmice ==
Order: Passeriformes Family: Paridae

The Paridae are mainly small stocky woodland species with short stout bills. Some have crests. They are adaptable birds, with a mixed diet including seeds and insects.

- White-shouldered black-tit, Melaniparus guineensis

== Penduline tits ==
Order: Passeriformes Family: Remizidae

The penduline tits are a group of small passerine birds related to the true tits. They are insectivores. There are 13 species worldwide and 1 species which occurs in Guinea-Bissau.

- Yellow penduline-tit, Anthoscopus parvulus

== Larks ==
Order: Passeriformes Family: Alaudidae

Larks are small terrestrial birds with often extravagant songs and display flights. Most larks are fairly dull in appearance. Their food is insects and seeds.

- Rufous-rumped lark, Pinarocorys erythropygia
- Chestnut-backed sparrow-lark, Eremopterix leucotis (A)
- Flappet lark, Mirafra rufocinnamomea (A)
- Horsfield's bushlark, Mirafra cjavanica (A)
- Greater short-toed lark, Calandrella brachydactyla (A)
- Sun lark, Galerida modesta
- Crested lark, Galerida cristata

== Nicators ==
Order: Passeriformes Family: Nicatoridae

The nicators are shrike-like, with hooked bills. They are endemic to sub-Saharan Africa.

- Western nicator, Nicator chloris

== African warblers ==
Order: Passeriformes Family: Macrosphenidae

African warblers are small to medium-sized insectivores which are found in a wide variety of habitats south of the Sahara.

- Northern crombec, Sylvietta brachyura
- Moustached grass-warbler, Melocichla mentalis
- Green hylia, Hylia prasina

== Cisticolas and allies ==
Order: Passeriformes Family: Cisticolidae

The Cisticolidae are warblers found mainly in warmer southern regions of the Old World. They are generally very small birds of drab brown or grey appearance found in open country such as grassland or scrub.

- Senegal eremomela, Eremomela pusilla
- Green-backed camaroptera, Camaroptera brachyura
- Olive-green camaroptera, Camaroptera chloronota
- Yellow-breasted apalis, Apalis flavida
- Tawny-flanked prinia, Prinia subflava
- Red-winged prinia, Prinia erythroptera
- Oriole warbler, Hypergerus atriceps
- Red-faced cisticola, Cisticola erythrops
- Singing cisticola, Cisticola cantans
- Whistling cisticola, Cisticola lateralis
- Dorst's cisticola, Cisticola guinea
- Winding cisticola, Cisticola marginatus
- Croaking cisticola, Cisticola natalensis
- Siffling cisticola, Cisticola brachypterus
- Rufous cisticola, Cisticola rufus
- Zitting cisticola, Cisticola juncidis
- Black-backed cisticola, Cisticola eximius

== Reed warblers and allies ==
Order: Passeriformes Family: Acrocephalidae

The members of this family are usually rather large for "warblers". Most are rather plain olivaceous brown above with much yellow to beige below. They are usually found in open woodland, reedbeds, or tall grass. The family occurs mostly in southern to western Eurasia and surroundings, but it also ranges far into the Pacific, with some species in Africa.

- Eastern olivaceous warbler, Iduna pallida
- Western olivaceous warbler, Iduna opaca
- Melodious warbler, Hippolais polyglotta
- Icterine warbler, Hippolais icterina (A)
- Sedge warbler, Acrocephalus schoenobaenus
- Eurasian reed warbler, Acrocephalus scirpaceus
- Great reed warbler, Acrocephalus arundinaceus (A)

== Grassbirds and allies ==
Order: Passeriformes Family: Locustellidae

Locustellidae are a family of small insectivorous songbirds found mainly in Eurasia, Africa, and the Australian region. They are smallish birds with tails that are usually long and pointed, and tend to be drab brownish or buffy all over.

- Savi's warbler, Locustella luscinioides (A)

== Swallows ==
Order: Passeriformes Family: Hirundinidae

The family Hirundinidae is adapted to aerial feeding. They have a slender streamlined body, long pointed wings and a short bill with a wide gape. The feet are adapted to perching rather than walking, and the front toes are partially joined at the base.

- Plain martin, Pseudhirundo griseopyga (A)
- Bank swallow, Riparia riparia (A)
- Barn swallow, Hirundo rustica
- Red-chested swallow, Hirundo lucida
- White-throated blue swallow, Hirundo nigrita
- Wire-tailed swallow, Hirundo smithii
- Pied-winged swallow, Hirundo leucosoma
- Red-rumped swallow, Cecropis daurica
- Lesser striped swallow, Cecropis abyssinica (A)
- Rufous-chested swallow, Cecropis semirufa
- Mosque swallow, Cecropis senegalensis
- Preuss's swallow, Petrochelidon preussi
- Common house-martin, Delichon urbica
- Fanti sawwing, Psalidoprocne obscura
- Gray-rumped swallow, Pseudhirundo griseopyga

== Bulbuls ==
Order: Passeriformes Family: Pycnonotidae

Bulbuls are medium-sized songbirds. Some are colourful with yellow, red or orange vents, cheeks, throats or supercilia, but most are drab, with uniform olive-brown to black plumage. Some species have distinct crests.

- Slender-billed greenbul, Stelgidillas gracilirostris
- Gray-headed bristlebill, Bleda canicapillus
- Simple greenbul, Chlorocichla simplex
- Honeyguide greenbul, Baeopogon indicator
- Yellow-throated greenbul, Atimastillas flavicollis
- Swamp greenbul, Thescelocichla leucopleura
- Red-tailed greenbul, Criniger calurus
- Little greenbul, Eurillas virens
- Leaf-love, Phyllastrephus scandens
- White-throated greenbul, Phyllastrephus albigularis
- Common bulbul, Pycnonotus barbatus

== Leaf warblers ==
Order: Passeriformes Family: Phylloscopidae

Leaf warblers are a family of small insectivorous birds found mostly in Eurasia and ranging into Wallacea and Africa. The species are of various sizes, often green-plumaged above and yellow below, or more subdued with greyish-green to greyish-brown colours.

- Wood warbler, Phylloscopus sibilatrix
- Willow warbler, Phylloscopus trochilus
- Common chiffchaff, Phylloscopus collybita (A)
- Iberian chiffchaff, Phylloscopus ibericus (A)

== Sylviid warblers, parrotbills, and allies ==
Order: Passeriformes Family: Sylviidae

The family Sylviidae is a group of small insectivorous passerine birds. They mainly occur as breeding species, as the common name implies, in Europe, Asia and, to a lesser extent, Africa. Most are of generally undistinguished appearance, but many have distinctive songs.

- Eurasian blackcap, Sylvia atricapilla
- Garden warbler, Sylvia borin
- Western subalpine warbler, Curruca iberiae

== White-eyes, yuhinas, and allies ==
Order: Passeriformes Family: Zosteropidae

The white-eyes are small and mostly undistinguished, their plumage above being generally some dull colour like greenish-olive, but some species have a white or bright yellow throat, breast or lower parts, and several have buff flanks. As their name suggests, many species have a white ring around each eye.

- Northern yellow white-eye, Zosterops senegalensis

== Ground babblers and allies ==
Order: Passeriformes Family: Pellorneidae

These small to medium-sized songbirds have soft fluffy plumage but are otherwise rather diverse. Members of the genus Illadopsis are found in forests, but some other genera are birds of scrublands.

- Brown illadopsis, Illadopsis fulvescens
- Puvel's illadopsis, Illadopsis puveli

== Laughingthrushes and allies ==
Order: Passeriformes Family: Leiothrichidae

The members of this family are diverse in size and colouration, though those of genus Turdoides tend to be brown or greyish. The family is found in Africa, India, and southeast Asia.

- Capuchin babbler, Turdoides atripennis
- Brown babbler, Turdoides plebejus
- Blackcap babbler, Turdoides reinwardtii

== Treecreepers ==
Order: Passeriformes Family: Certhiidae

Treecreepers are small woodland birds, brown above and white below. They have thin pointed down-curved bills, which they use to extricate insects from bark. They have stiff tail feathers, like woodpeckers, which they use to support themselves on vertical trees.

- African spotted creeper, Salpornis salvadori

== Oxpeckers ==
Order: Passeriformes Family: Buphagidae

As both the English and scientific names of these birds imply, they feed on ectoparasites, primarily ticks, found on large mammals.

- Yellow-billed oxpecker, Buphagus africanus

== Starlings ==
Order: Passeriformes Family: Sturnidae

Starlings are small to medium-sized passerine birds. Their flight is strong and direct and they are very gregarious. Their preferred habitat is fairly open country. They eat insects and fruit. Plumage is typically dark with a metallic sheen.

- Violet-backed starling, Cinnyricinclus leucogaster
- Long-tailed glossy-starling, Lamprotornis caudatus
- Splendid starling, Lamprotornis splendidus
- Chestnut-bellied starling, Lamprotornis pulcher
- Lesser blue-eared starling, Lamprotornis chloropterus
- Purple starling, Lamprotornis purpureus
- Bronze-tailed starling, Lamprotornis chalcurus

== Thrushes and allies ==
Order: Passeriformes Family: Turdidae

The thrushes are a group of passerine birds that occur mainly in the Old World. They are plump, soft plumaged, small to medium-sized insectivores or sometimes omnivores, often feeding on the ground. Many have attractive songs.

- African thrush, Turdus pelios

== Old World flycatchers ==
Order: Passeriformes Family: Muscicapidae

Old World flycatchers are a large group of small passerine birds native to the Old World. They are mainly small arboreal insectivores. The appearance of these birds is highly varied, but they mostly have weak songs and harsh calls.

- Spotted flycatcher, Muscicapa striata
- Swamp flycatcher, Muscicapa aquatica
- Pale flycatcher, Agricola pallidus
- White-browed forest-flycatcher, Fraseria cinerascens
- Gray tit-flycatcher, Fraseria plumbea
- Northern black-flycatcher, Melaenornis edolioides
- White-tailed alethe, Alethe diademata
- Black scrub-robin, Cercotrichas podobe
- Snowy-crowned robin-chat, Cossypha niveicapilla
- White-crowned robin-chat, Cossypha albicapilla
- Common nightingale, Luscinia megarhynchos
- European pied flycatcher, Ficedula hypoleuca
- Common redstart, Phoenicurus phoenicurus
- Rufous-tailed rock-thrush, Monticola saxatilis
- Blue rock-thrush, Monticola solitarius (A)
- Whinchat, Saxicola rubetra
- Mocking cliff-chat, Thamnolaea cinnamomeiventris (A)
- Northern wheatear, Oenanthe oenanthe
- Atlas wheatear, Oenanthe seebohmi
- Heuglin's wheatear, Oenanthe heuglini (A)
- Desert wheatear, Oenanthe deserti (A)
- White-fronted black-chat, Oenanthe albifrons
- Familiar chat, Oenanthe familiaris (A)

== Sunbirds and spiderhunters ==
Order: Passeriformes Family: Nectariniidae

The sunbirds and spiderhunters are very small passerine birds which feed largely on nectar, although they will also take insects, especially when feeding young. Flight is fast and direct on their short wings. Most species can take nectar by hovering like a hummingbird, but usually perch to feed.

- Mouse-brown sunbird, Anthreptes gabonicus
- Western violet-backed sunbird, Anthreptes longuemarei
- Collared sunbird, Hedydipna collaris
- Pygmy sunbird, Hedydipna platura
- Green-headed sunbird, Cyanomitra verticalis
- Olive sunbird, Cyanomitra olivacea
- Scarlet-chested sunbird, Chalcomitra senegalensis
- Olive-bellied sunbird, Cinnyris chloropygius
- Beautiful sunbird, Cinnyris pulchellus
- Splendid sunbird, Cinnyris coccinigaster
- Variable sunbird, Cinnyris venustus
- Copper sunbird, Cinnyris cupreus

== Weavers and allies ==
Order: Passeriformes Family: Ploceidae

The weavers are small passerine birds related to the finches. They are seed-eating birds with rounded conical bills. The males of many species are brightly coloured, usually in red or yellow and black, some species show variation in colour only in the breeding season.

- White-billed buffalo-weaver, Bubalornis albirostris
- Speckle-fronted weaver, Sporopipes frontalis
- Chestnut-crowned sparrow-weaver, Plocepasser superciliosus
- Blue-billed malimbe, Malimbus nitens
- Red-headed malimbe, Malimbus rubricollis
- Red-headed weaver, Anaplectes rubriceps
- Little weaver, Ploceus luteolus
- Olive-naped weaver, Ploceus brachypterus
- Vitelline masked-weaver, Ploceus vitellinus (A)
- Heuglin's masked-weaver, Ploceus heuglini
- Chestnut-and-black weaver, Ploceus castaneofuscus
- Village weaver, Ploceus cucullatus
- Black-headed weaver, Ploceus melanocephalus
- Compact weaver, Pachyphantes superciliosus
- Red-headed quelea, Quelea erythrops
- Red-billed quelea, Quelea quelea
- Northern red bishop, Euplectes franciscanus
- Black-winged bishop, Euplectes hordeaceus
- Yellow-crowned bishop, Euplectes afer
- Yellow-mantled widowbird, Euplectes macroura

== Waxbills and allies ==
Order: Passeriformes Family: Estrildidae

The estrildid finches are small passerine birds of the Old World tropics and Australasia. They are gregarious and often colonial seed eaters with short thick but pointed bills. They are all similar in structure and habits, but have wide variation in plumage colours and patterns.

- Bronze mannikin, Spermestes cucullatus
- Magpie mannikin, Spermestes fringilloides
- Black-and-white mannikin, Spermestes bicolor
- African silverbill, Euodice cantans
- Chestnut-breasted nigrita, Nigrita bicolor
- Gray-headed oliveback, Delacourella capistrata
- Lavender waxbill, Glaucestrilda caerulescens
- Orange-cheeked waxbill, Estrilda melpoda
- Black-rumped waxbill, Estrilda troglodytes
- Quailfinch, Ortygospiza atricollis
- Cut-throat, Amadina fasciata
- Zebra waxbill, Amandava subflava
- Red-cheeked cordonbleu, Uraeginthus bengalus
- Western bluebill, Spermophaga haematina
- Crimson seedcracker, Pyrenestes sanguineus
- Green-winged pytilia, Pytilia melba
- Red-winged pytilia, Pytilia phoenicoptera
- Dybowski's twinspot, Euschistospiza dybowskii
- Red-billed firefinch, Lagonosticta senegala
- African firefinch, Lagonosticta rubricata
- Black-bellied firefinch, Lagonosticta rara (A)
- Bar-breasted firefinch, Lagonosticta rufopicta
- Black-faced firefinch, Lagonosticta larvata

== Indigobirds ==
Order: Passeriformes Family: Viduidae

The indigobirds are finch-like species which usually have black or indigo predominating in their plumage. All are brood parasites, which lay their eggs in the nests of estrildid finches.

- Pin-tailed whydah, Vidua macroura
- Village indigobird, Vidua chalybeata
- Wilson's indigobird, Vidua wilsoni
- Jambandu indigobird, Vidua raricola
- Baka indigobird, Vidua larvaticola
- Cameroon indigobird, Vidua camerunensis
- Variable indigobird, Vidua funerea

== Old World sparrows ==
Order: Passeriformes Family: Passeridae

Old World sparrows are small passerine birds. In general, sparrows tend to be small, plump, brown or grey birds with short tails and short powerful beaks. Sparrows are seed eaters, but they also consume small insects.

- House sparrow, Passer domesticus
- Northern gray-headed sparrow, Passer griseus
- Sahel bush sparrow, Gymnoris dentata

== Wagtails and pipits ==
Order: Passeriformes Family: Motacillidae

Motacillidae is a family of small passerine birds with medium to long tails. They include the wagtails, longclaws and pipits. They are slender, ground feeding insectivores of open country.

- Mountain wagtail, Motacilla clara
- Gray wagtail, Motacilla cinerea (A)
- Western yellow wagtail, Motacilla flava
- African pied wagtail, Motacilla aguimp
- White wagtail, Motacilla alba (A)
- Tawny pipit, Anthus campestris
- Plain-backed pipit, Anthus leucophrys
- Tree pipit, Anthus trivialis (A)
- Red-throated pipit, Anthus cervinus (A)
- Yellow-throated longclaw, Macronyx croceus

== Finches, euphonias, and allies ==
Order: Passeriformes Family: Fringillidae

Finches are seed-eating passerine birds, that are small to moderately large and have a strong beak, usually conical and in some species very large. All have twelve tail feathers and nine primaries. These birds have a bouncing flight with alternating bouts of flapping and gliding on closed wings, and most sing well.

- White-rumped seedeater, Crithagra leucopygius
- Yellow-fronted canary, Crithagra mozambicus

== Old World buntings ==
Order: Passeriformes Family: Emberizidae

The emberizids are a large family of passerine birds. They are seed-eating birds with distinctively shaped bills. Many emberizid species have distinctive head patterns. There are 3 species which have been recorded in Guinea-Bissau.

- Brown-rumped bunting, Emberiza affinis
- Cabanis's bunting, Emberiza cabanisi
- Gosling's bunting, Emberiza goslingi (A)

== See also ==
- List of birds
- Lists of birds by region
