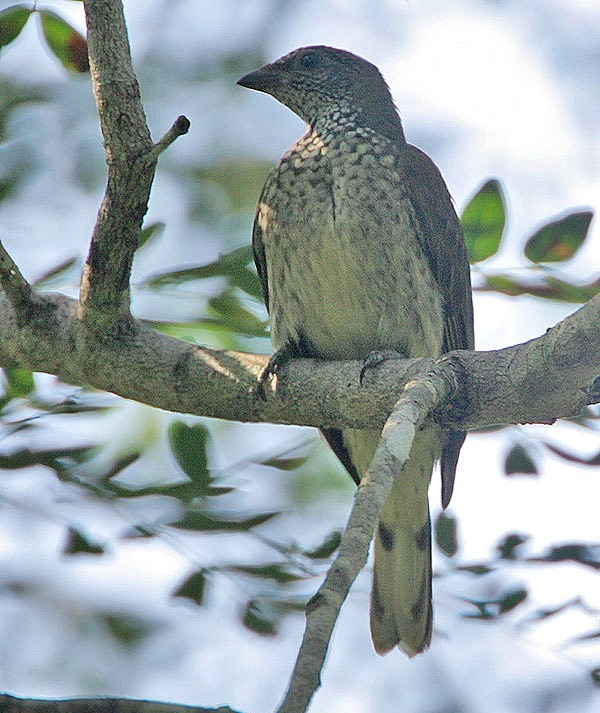
- In Arabuko-Sokoke Forest

Conservation status
- Least Concern (IUCN 3.1)

Scientific classification
- Kingdom: Animalia
- Phylum: Chordata
- Class: Aves
- Order: Piciformes
- Family: Indicatoridae
- Genus: Indicator
- Species: I. variegatus

Binomial name
- Indicator variegatus Lesson, 1830

= Scaly-throated honeyguide =

Species of bird

The scaly-throated honeyguide (Indicator variegatus) is a species of bird in the family Indicatoridae. They have a mutualistic relationship with humans in which they attract beekeepers towards bees' nests and then feeding on the remains, especially larvae.

== Taxonomy ==
The scaly-throated honeyguide is closely related to the spotted honeyguide (Indicator maculatus), of which it shares part of its range. The two species are sympatric in South Sudan and Southwest Uganda.

Scaly-throated honeyguides from Southern Somalia to Northeast Tanzania were previously regarded as a separate race (jubaensis). However, the species is currently regarded as monotypic, with no subspecies.

== Description ==
Mature scaly-throated honeyguides range between 18 and 19 centimetres (7.1 and 7.5 in) and typically weigh around 34 to 55 grams (0.075 to 0.121 lb), occasionally reaching up to 61 grams (0.134 lb). Males are larger than females, with recorded weights of males ranging from 50 to 56 grams (0.110 to 0.123 lb) and weights of females generally ranging from 36.6 to 55 grams (0.081 to 0.121 lb). However, male birds in Uganda have been reported to weigh as low as 31 grams (0.068 lb) and females, up to 60.5 grams (0.133 lb).

The scaly-throated honeyguide appears olive with a white or buffy yellow tinge that is more clearly seen on its middle and lower breast. Its throat and breast also varies between a scaly to streaky olive-gray and white. These markings on its breast differentiate the species from other honeyguide except for the spotted honeyguide, which it is distinguished from by less green, browner upperparts, paler and grayer underparts, and less spotting. Stripes are present on its face and crown, sometimes reaching its nape. It exhibits an olive-brown upper back, which becomes more greenish towards the mid-back. Its rump is also yellow-green, while its tail displays a black-tipped white outer pattern with short outermost feathers. Its legs and feet are typically a greenish-gray or yellowish-olive. Eye colors range from hazel to gray brown or deep brown.

Immature has a greener throat and breast, which is also marked with broader and blacker spots. Its cheeks and the top of its head are darker. Its head is also more finely streaked and its tail is nearly all white. Males have a black gape, while females have a pink-gape with some dusky gray that becomes more apparent in older females.

== Range ==
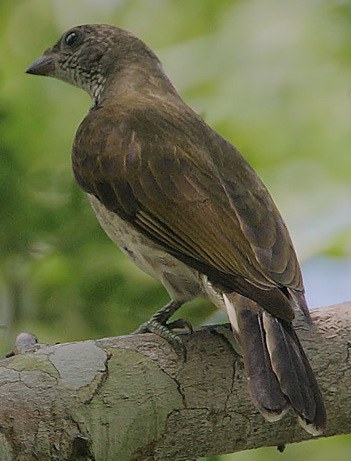
Dorsal view, Arabuko-Sokoke Forest, coastal Kenya

It is found in Angola, Burundi, DRC, Eswatini, Ethiopia, Kenya, Malawi, Mozambique, Rwanda, Somalia, South Africa, South Sudan, Tanzania, Uganda, Zambia, and Zimbabwe.

== Habitat ==
Scaly-throated honeyguides are found in dense woodland, thickets, forest, overgrown plantations, and bamboo, usually only identifiable by their high-pitched, trill-like ascending call. Regarding size, they are 18–19 cm in length, weighing 34–55 g and rarely up to 61 g. It is typically found in below 2,200 metres (7,200 ft), but has been observed at elevations up to 3,350 metres (10,990 ft) on Mt. Elgon.

== Behaviour ==
=== Vocalization ===
Its main song is a churring trill, a low croak into a loud rising call that lasts three to four seconds. When repeated, the common soft whistle call made by the scaly-throated honeyguide sounds similar to the whistles of scimitarbills. It is often sung by birds while perched under the canopy of a particular tree. Males tend to start singing early in the morning (sometimes before daybreak) and continue at intervals throughout the day. Aggressive males may utter a song-like call that sounds like 'dddddddddeeeet-tyew.' Both males and females have also been observed producing a 'kizz-kizz-kizz' sound when chasing other birds, which resembles the calls of the lesser honeyguide (Indicator minor). Young birds may also let out loud 'chess-chess-chess' notes. In some areas, songs are restricted to the breeding period, although they are occasionally heard before or after.

=== Breeding ===
The species is territorial, with males maintaining traditional song sites (often a particular tree or bush), which can be help for up to eight years or may change more frequently, even during a season. Song sites may be as close together as 200 to 250 metres (660 to 820 ft). In the tropics, birds sing throughout the year and may sing in long bursts after intervals of silence. Additionally, they may pause their song to chase off approaching birds with shrieks. In some areas inhabited by females there are no known singing sites. Males will typically find one or more females and copulate away from their song posts. They typically first breed at 3 or more years (or sometimes two). Females may breed primarily with one male or with several starting at two years old. Birds typically breed in wooded areas, sometimes around October, although eggs are laid throughout August to February in South Africa, May to August in Kenya, September to October in Malawi, October in Zambia, and September to January in Zimbabwe. Egg incubation occurs for approximately 18 or 19 days.

=== Brood Parasitism ===
The scaly-throated honeyguide is a brood parasite. Known hosts include the green barbet, black-collared barbet, Whyte's barbet, yellow-rumped tinkerbird, Nubian woodpecker, golden-tailed woodpecker, African grey woodpecker, and cardinal woodpecker. Additionally, scaly-throated honeyguides have been observed parasitizing olive woodpeckers. Females lay three to five eggs per series, with several series in each clutch. Occasionally, more than one egg is deposited into a host nest, and while scaly-throat honeyguide fledglings do not always remove or destroy hosts' eggs, they have been observed doing so. They are born with fully-developed transparent bill hooks that may help them destroy the eggs or kill the young of the hosts. Young scaly-throated honeyguides can be fed up to 45 times in eight hours by hosts, and fledging occurs in 27 to 35 days.

=== Feeding ===
Its typical diet includes beeswax, honey, insects (bees and their grubs, aphids, ants, flies, termites, beetles, caterpillars), arthropods, and sometimes, seeds and fruits (especially figs). It competes with other wax-eating species, such as the greater honeyguide. It may join mixed-species foraging flocks or flychatch from perches. Birds will tear at honeycomb or wax with their bill and hold the wax between their legs while consuming it. Since wax is a major part of their diet, honeyguides have a specialized digestive system with a prolonged gut transit time and greater levels of lipase and other enzymes. Nestlings will eat the food of their hosts.

== Relationship with humans ==
The scaly-throated honeyguide have been observed guiding humans and honey badgers to bee hives, although this is not particularly common, possibly because of the species' secretive habitat locations. To locate bee hives, they often watch for guiding greater honeyguides and other activity that may indicate honey harvesting. As with other honeyguides, they wait for a hive to be ransacked and then eat what remains, including bee larvae. Generally, the species is regarded as mostly unobtrusive, except for when they are at beeswax sources and where they are singing.

== Status ==
The species is fairly common and widespread, namely in the Ngoye Forest of South Africa, and is not globally threatened. However, it is somewhat uncommon in Somalia, Kenya, and Tanzania. Scaly-throated honeyguides may be common in the Ngoye Forest due to the high population of Green Barbets, which it is known to parasitize. No specific threats towards its population have been identified.
