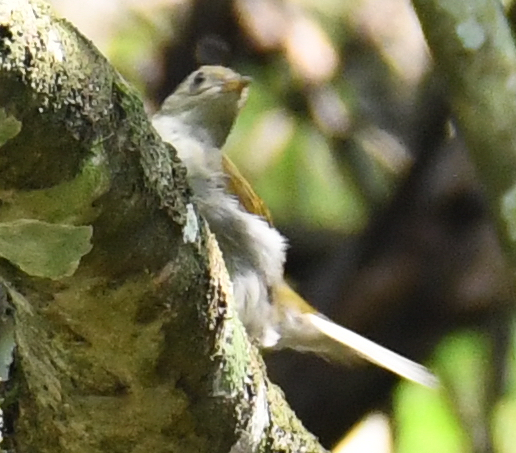

Conservation status
- Near Threatened (IUCN 3.1)

Scientific classification
- Kingdom: Animalia
- Phylum: Chordata
- Class: Aves
- Order: Piciformes
- Family: Indicatoridae
- Genus: Melignomon
- Species: M. eisentrauti

Binomial name
- Melignomon eisentrauti Louette, 1981

= Yellow-footed honeyguide =

Species of bird

The yellow-footed honeyguide (Melignomon eisentrauti) is a species of bird in the family Indicatoridae. It is found in Cameroon, Guinea, Liberia, Sierra Leone, Ivory Coast, Ghana and Nigeria. Its natural habitat is subtropical or tropical moist lowland forests. It is threatened by loss of its forest habitat.

== Description ==
This small, unobtrusive bird grows to a length of about 18 cm (7 in). The sexes are similar in this species but females are slightly smaller than males. The head and upper parts are olive green, with the back rather yellower than the head. The flight feathers of the wings and the two central feathers of the tail are brownish-black, as are the bases of the outer four pairs of feathers, the remainder being white, with dark tips. The chin, throat, breast and front of the belly are pale grey, while the rear belly and the under-tail coverts are pure white. The beak is yellowish, the orbital ring greenish-yellow and the iris brown. The legs and feet are yellow. The voice is a sequence of about a dozen clear notes, each rising in pitch, the whole series gradually slowing and descending.

== Distribution ==
The yellow-footed honeyguide is native to tropical West Africa where it has been recorded in Sierra Leone, Liberia, Guinea, Ghana, Ivory Coast, Nigeria and Cameroon. It is known from lowland forest at altitudes of up to 750 m (2,500 ft).

== Ecology ==
This bird feeds on insects, fruits and seeds, and probably on beeswax as evidenced by a waxy yellow material being found among the stomach contents. Little is known of its breeding behaviour.

== Conservation status ==
The yellow-footed honeyguide occupies a total area of around 485,000 km^{2} (187,000 sq mi) and is described as being rare, although this may be because it is an unobtrusive bird. It is threatened by habitat destruction, as the forests where it is found are being degraded or cleared, but it is tolerant of some degree of habitat disturbance. For these reasons, the International Union for Conservation of Nature suspects that its population is slowly declining and has assessed the species as having a "near threatened" conservation status.
