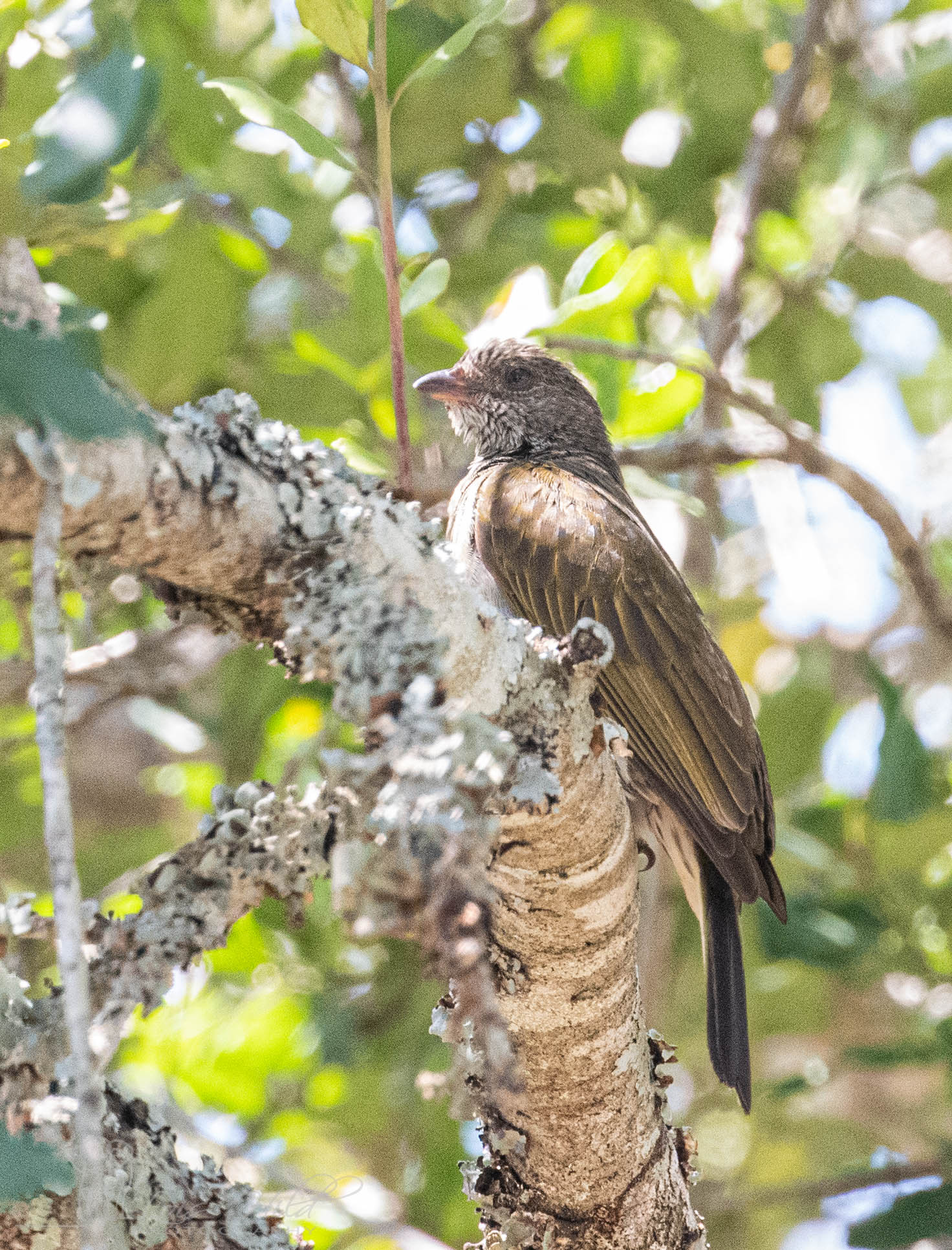

Conservation status
- Least Concern (IUCN 3.1)

Scientific classification
- Kingdom: Animalia
- Phylum: Chordata
- Class: Aves
- Order: Piciformes
- Family: Indicatoridae
- Genus: Indicator
- Species: I. meliphilus

Binomial name
- Indicator meliphilus (Oberholser, 1905)

= Pallid honeyguide =

Species of bird

The pallid honeyguide (Indicator meliphilus) is a species of bird in the family Indicatoridae. The species is also known as the eastern least honyeguide. It is found in Angola, Democratic Republic of the Congo, Kenya, Malawi, Mozambique, Tanzania, Uganda, Zambia, and Zimbabwe.

== Taxonomy and systematics ==
The species is very closely related to Willcocks's honeyguide, and the two species are very similar in size, and this species will even respond to recordings of the Willcocks's honeyguide's voice. Another species, Indicator narokensis, has been described from the border of Kenya and Tanzania; this appears to have been described from a juvenile pallid honeyeater and is not accepted as a valid species.
