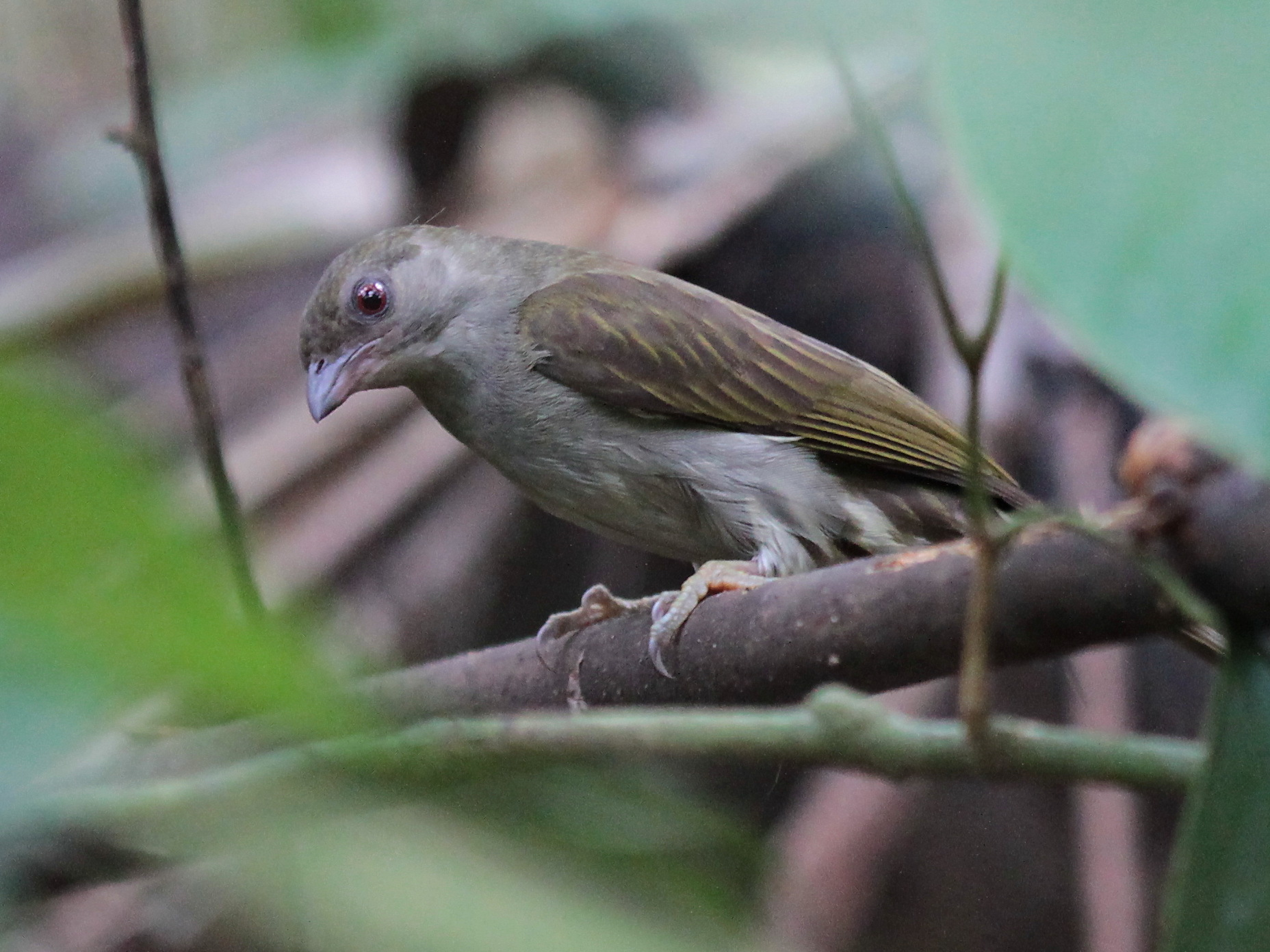

Conservation status
- Near Threatened (IUCN 3.1)

Scientific classification
- Kingdom: Animalia
- Phylum: Chordata
- Class: Aves
- Order: Piciformes
- Family: Indicatoridae
- Genus: Indicator
- Species: I. archipelagicus

Binomial name
- Indicator archipelagicus Temminck, 1832

= Malayan honeyguide =

Species of bird

The Malayan honeyguide or Malaysian honeyguide (Indicator archipelagicus) is a bird in the family Indicatoridae, which are paleotropical birds related to the woodpeckers. The species is native to Southeast Asia.

== Description ==
It is a medium-sized, up to 18 cm long, olive-brown honeyguide with greenish streaks, reddish iris, thick grey bill and greyish white below. The male has a yellow patch on the shoulder, while the female has none. The young resembles the female with streaked underparts.

== Habitat and range ==
The Malayan honeyguide occurs throughout lowland broadleaved forests of western Thailand, Peninsular Malaysia, Borneo and the island of Sumatra.

== Habits ==
The call of the Malayan honeyguide is a cat-like "meow", followed by a rattling sound. The diet consists mainly of insects, especially wild bees and wasps. It nests in tree hollows.

== Status ==
Due to ongoing habitat loss, local and sparse population, the Malayan honeyguide is evaluated as near threatened on the IUCN Red List of Threatened Species.
