= Zenker's honeyguide =

Conservation status
- Least Concern (IUCN 3.1)

Scientific classification
- Kingdom: Animalia
- Phylum: Chordata
- Class: Aves
- Order: Piciformes
- Family: Indicatoridae
- Genus: Melignomon
- Species: M. zenkeri

Binomial name
- Melignomon zenkeri Reichenow, 1898

Species of bird

Zenker's honeyguide (Melignomon zenkeri) is a species of bird in the family Indicatoridae. It is found in Cameroon, Central African Republic, Republic of the Congo, Democratic Republic of the Congo, Equatorial Guinea, Gabon, and Uganda.

The common name and Latin binomial commemorate the German botanist Georg Zenker.
