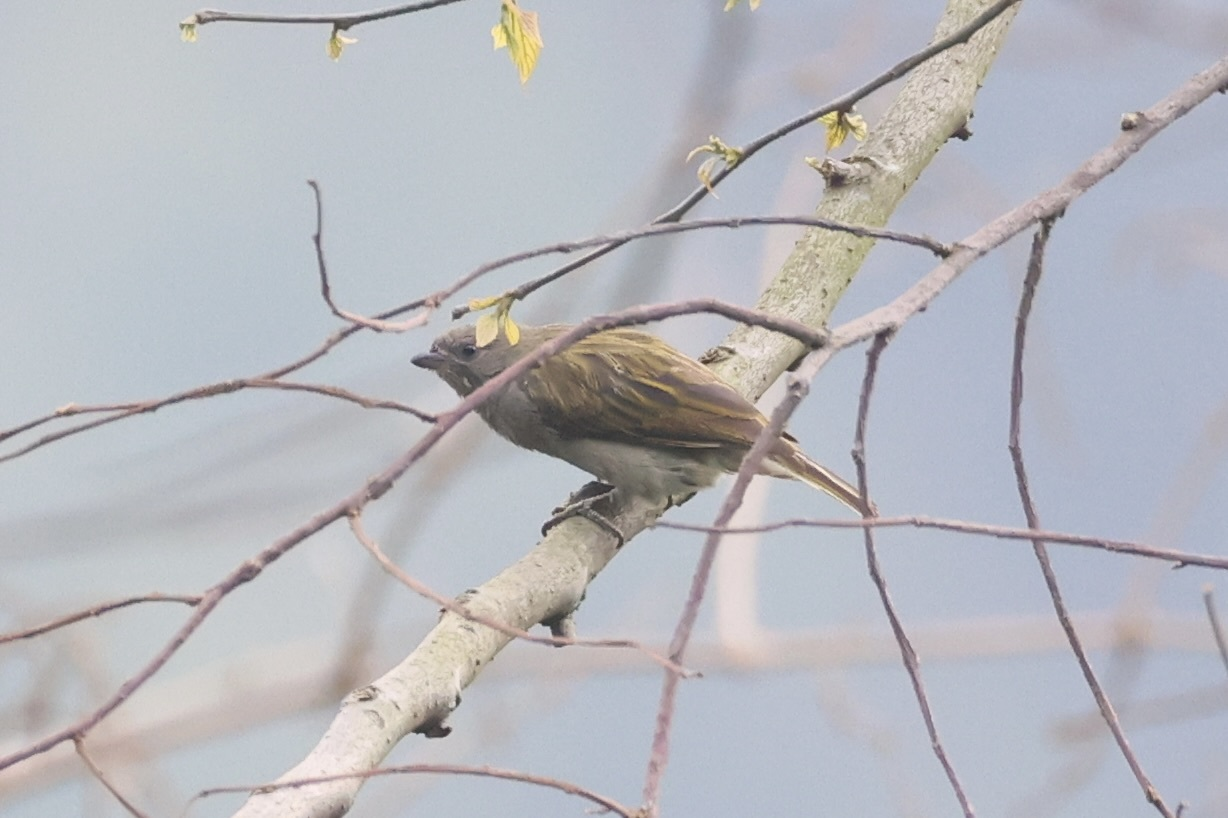

Conservation status
- Least Concern (IUCN 3.1)

Scientific classification
- Kingdom: Animalia
- Phylum: Chordata
- Class: Aves
- Order: Piciformes
- Family: Indicatoridae
- Genus: Indicator
- Species: I. pumilio

Binomial name
- Indicator pumilio Chapin, 1958

= Dwarf honeyguide =

Species of bird

The dwarf honeyguide (Indicator pumilio) is a species of bird in the family Indicatoridae. It is endemic to the Albertine Rift montane forests. It is threatened by habitat loss. Just like other honeyguides, this species is a brood parasite.
