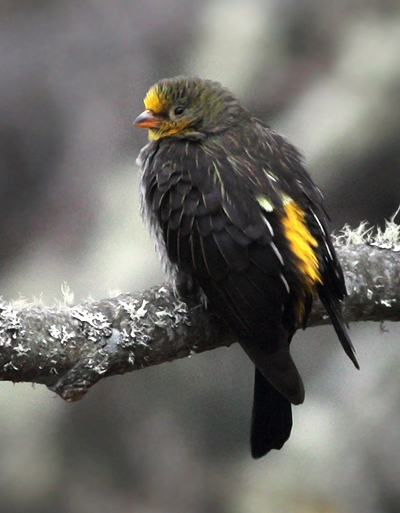
- From Eaglenest Wildlife Sanctuary in Arunachal Pradesh, India

Conservation status
- Near Threatened (IUCN 3.1)

Scientific classification
- Kingdom: Animalia
- Phylum: Chordata
- Class: Aves
- Order: Piciformes
- Family: Indicatoridae
- Genus: Indicator
- Species: I. xanthonotus

Binomial name
- Indicator xanthonotus Blyth, 1842

= Yellow-rumped honeyguide =

Species of bird

The yellow-rumped honeyguide (Indicator xanthonotus) is a sparrow-sized bird in the honeyguide family that is found in Asia, mainly in montane forests along the Himalayas. They are very finch-like but the feet are strong and zygodactyl, with two toes facing forward and two backward. They perch on honeycombs and feed on wax. Males tend to be territorial and stay near honeycombs while females and juveniles forage widely. They are brood parasites, laying their eggs in the nests of tree-hole breeders, possibly barbets.

== Description ==
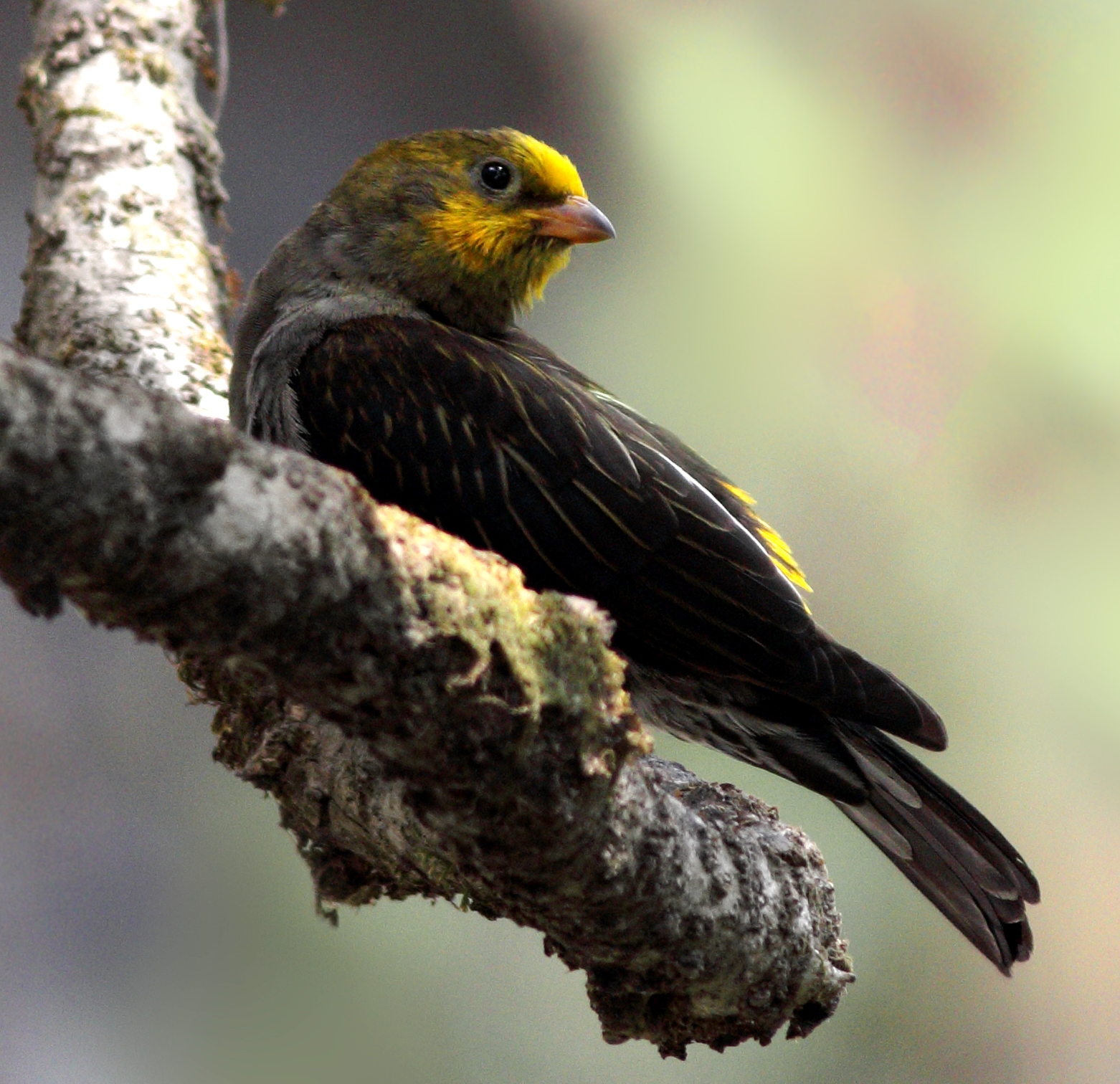
From Pabyuk-Naitam, East Sikkim, India.

The yellow-rumped honeyguide is sparrow sized and has a stout finch-like bill. The plumage is largely dusky olive and the forehead and lores are orange. There is a streaked appearance to the wing feathers. The rump is deep orange and extends into the back grading to sulphur yellow. The chin and throat are yellowish while the lower plumage is pale grey with dark streaks. The bill is yellow but dark towards the tip. Females have less extensive yellow on the face and the rump is yellow and lacks the orange. Allan Octavian Hume described the subspecies radcliffi (after Colonel E. Delmé-Radcliffe) based on specimens from Hazara but no specimens or information from the region have subsequently been obtained putting it in some doubt. The species was described by Blyth based on specimens from near Darjeeling. Ripley described specimens from the Naga Hills as subspecies fulvus (not always recognized), said to be smaller and darker, with the streaking on the abdomen reduced and the yellow on the forehead restricted to the anterior. This population may be identical to the nominate of the eastern Himalayas. They have twelve tail feathers and nine primaries. The wing is long and pointed.

== Behaviour and ecology ==
A chipping call is produced in flight and when agitated. The flight is straight (may sometimes be undulating) and direct, sometimes in flocks of 20 to 30 birds. At deserted honeycombs, the bird clings tight and presses its tail on the surface of the comb. They feed mainly on the foundation wax of Apis laboriosa that attach the comb to rocks. They feed on active beehives without disturbing the bees much. They have been observed to make use of the attacks of Vespa mandarinia on Apis laboriosa colonies.

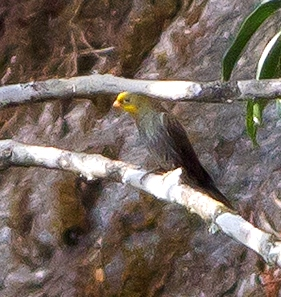
Adult photographed in West Sikkim, India

A display of a male involved fluffing its feathers, holding the bill high and flicking wings while swaying from side to side. A female was observed flicking its tail and pressing it down with wings drooped before being mounted by a male. They are brood parasites, laying their eggs in the nest of host species. The host species for the yellow-rumped honeyguide are as yet unknown and undocumented. Young birds of honeyguide species have bill-hooks with which they destroy the eggs and chicks of the host.

Adult males of this species defend exclusive, 3-dimensional territories around a bee nest or nests that hang from cliff faces. Males are polygynous, and they allow only the females with whom they had mated and their young to forge on the defended bee nests; other males and non-mate females are excluded from territories. This mating system is termed "resource-based, non-harem polygyny".

Unlike other honeyguides, this species has not been observed to lead humans and bears to bee hives.

== Distribution and habitat ==
The species has been recorded from northern Pakistan (Hazara and Murree Hills) but the population here may have been extirpated and then in the Himalayan regions of India from western Uttar Pradesh and Himachal Pradesh extending into Nepal, Sikkim, Arunachal Pradesh and Bhutan (where it is relatively common). It is also found in southeastern Tibet and northern Myanmar. It is found in coniferous and dry-deciduous forest with rocky boulders and cliffs. May make altitudinal movements seasonally.
