= Melignomon =

Scientific classification
- Kingdom: Animalia
- Phylum: Chordata
- Class: Aves
- Order: Piciformes
- Family: Indicatoridae
- Genus: Melignomon; Reichenow, 1898

Type species
- Melignomon zenkeri Reichenow, 1898

Genus of birds

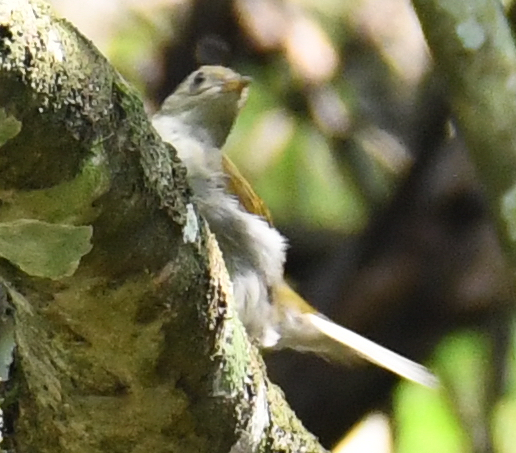
Yellow-footed honeyguide (Melignomon eisentrauti)

Melignomon is a genus of birds in the family Indicatoridae. It contains the following species:

- Yellow-footed honeyguide (Melignomon eisentrauti)
- Zenker's honeyguide (Melignomon zenkeri)
