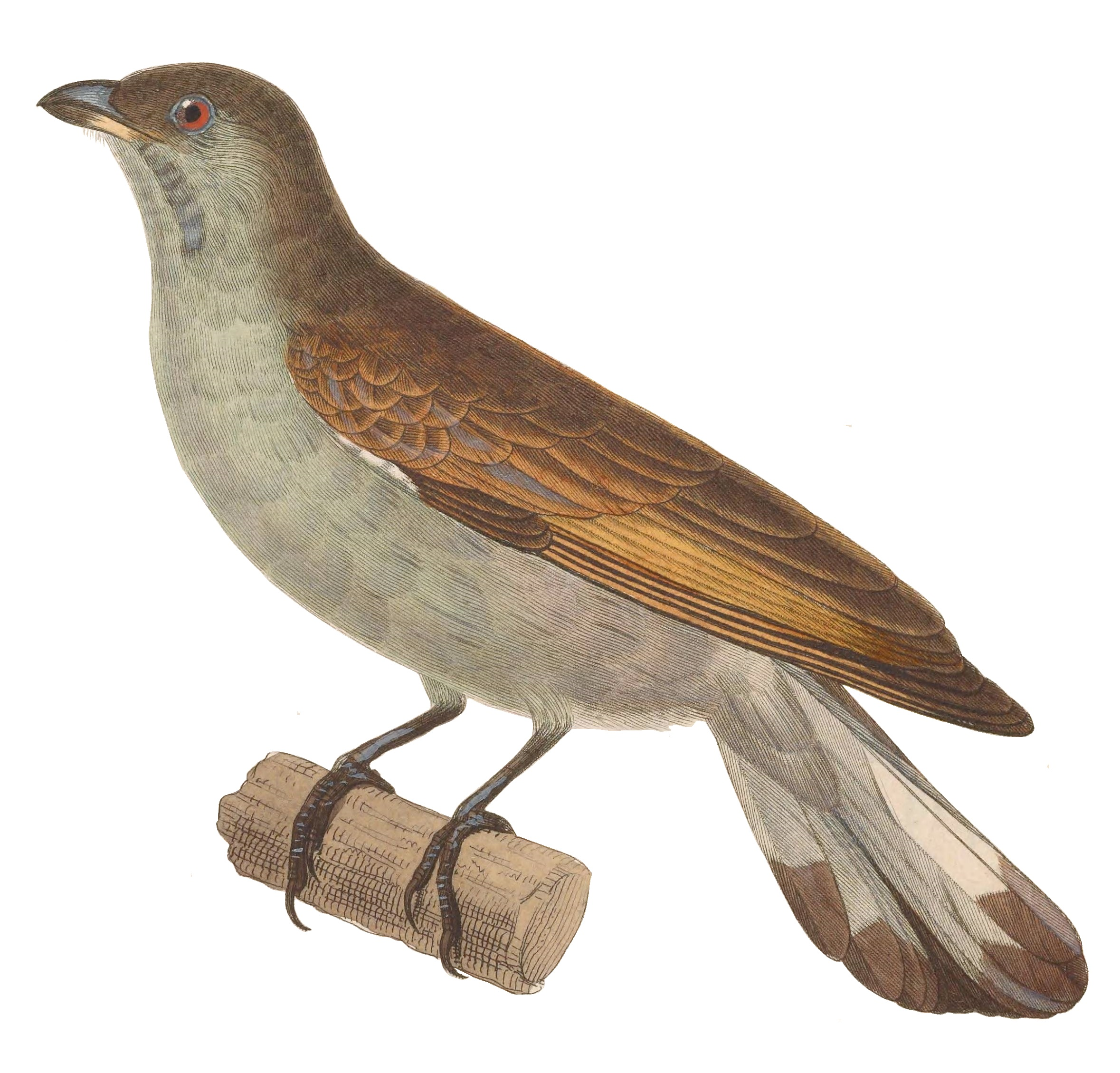
- Lesser honeyguide (Indicator minor)

Scientific classification
- Kingdom: Animalia
- Phylum: Chordata
- Class: Aves
- Order: Piciformes
- Family: Indicatoridae
- Genus: Indicator; Stephens, 1815

Type species
- Indicator sparrmanii Stephens, 1815

Species
- See text

= Indicator (genus) =

Genus of near passerine birds in the honeyguide family

Indicator is a genus of birds in the honeyguide family Indicatoridae. The name refers to the behaviour of some species, notably the greater honeyguide, which guide humans to bee colonies so that they can share in the spoils of wax and insects when the nest is broken into.

Indicator honeyguides are brood parasites which lay eggs in a nest of another species, in a series of about five during five to seven days. Most favour hole-nesting species, often the related barbets and woodpeckers. Nestlings have been known to physically eject their host's chicks from the nest, and they have hooks on their beaks with which they puncture the hosts' eggs or kill the nestlings, by repeated lacerations if not a fatal stab.

== Taxonomy ==
The genus Indicator was introduced in 1815 by the English naturalist James Francis Stephens with the type species, by tautonymy, as Indicator sparrmanii Stephens, a junior synonym of Cuculus indicator Sparrman, the greater honeyguide. The genus name is from Latin indicator, indicatoris meaning "guide" or "one that points out".

== Species ==
The genus contains ten species:

Image	Scientific name	Common name	Distribution
	Indicator maculatus	Spotted honeyguide	Angola, Benin, Cameroon, Central African Republic, Republic of the Congo, Democratic Republic of the Congo, Ivory Coast, Equatorial Guinea, Gabon, Gambia, Ghana, Guinea, Guinea-Bissau, Liberia, Mali, Nigeria, Senegal, Sierra Leone, South Sudan, Togo, and Uganda.
	Indicator variegatus	Scaly-throated honeyguide	Angola, Burundi, DRC, Eswatini, Ethiopia, Kenya, Malawi, Mozambique, Rwanda, Somalia, South Africa, South Sudan, Tanzania, Uganda, Zambia, and Zimbabwe.
	Indicator indicator	Greater honeyguide	sub-Saharan Africa
	Indicator archipelagicus	Malayan honeyguide	western Thailand, Peninsular Malaysia, Borneo and the island of Sumatra.
	Indicator minor	Lesser honeyguide	Widely distributed across sub-Saharan Africa
	Indicator willcocksi	Willcocks's honeyguide	Cameroon, Central African Republic, Republic of the Congo, Democratic Republic of the Congo, Ivory Coast, Equatorial Guinea, Gabon, Ghana, Guinea-Bissau, Liberia, Nigeria, Rwanda, Sierra Leone, and Uganda.
	Indicator exilis	Least honeyguide	Angola, Cameroon, Central African Republic, Republic of the Congo, Democratic Republic of the Congo, Ivory Coast, Equatorial Guinea, Gabon, Ghana, Guinea, Guinea-Bissau, Kenya, Liberia, Nigeria, Rwanda, Sierra Leone, South Sudan, Tanzania, Togo, Uganda, and Zambia.
	Indicator pumilio	Dwarf honeyguide	Democratic Republic of the Congo, Rwanda, Uganda, and possibly Burundi.
	Indicator meliphilus	Pallid honeyguide	Angola, Democratic Republic of the Congo, Kenya, Malawi, Mozambique, Tanzania, Uganda, Zambia, and Zimbabwe.
	Indicator xanthonotus	Yellow-rumped honeyguide	Nepal, Sikkim, Arunachal Pradesh and Bhutan
