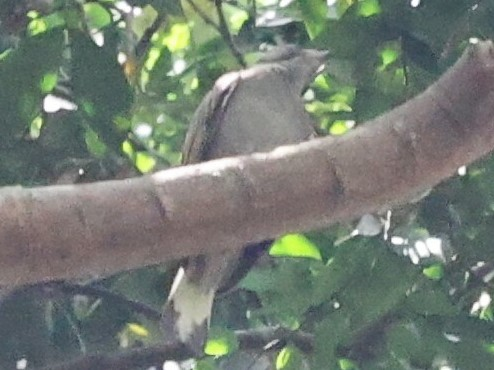

Conservation status
- Least Concern (IUCN 3.1)

Scientific classification
- Kingdom: Animalia
- Phylum: Chordata
- Class: Aves
- Order: Piciformes
- Family: Indicatoridae
- Genus: Indicator
- Species: I. exilis

Binomial name
- Indicator exilis (Cassin, 1856)

= Least honeyguide =

Species of bird

The least honeyguide (Indicator exilis) is a small species of bird in the family Indicatoridae. It is found in sub-Saharan Africa.

== Description ==
The least honeyguide (Indicator exilis) is a small member of the family Indicatoridae.

The plumage of the adult least honeyguide is an olive brown, with dark grey colouration on its underside and face. Pale spots are visible above the bill as well as on the tail when in flight. A narrow white line from the front of the eye to near the nostril can be seen on adult birds and a malar stripe can be seen stretching from the mandible to the birds ear-coverts.

A small bird, the least honey guide measures about 14 cm and weighs anywhere between 12 and 23 g. Males of the species tend to be noticeably larger in size than the females.

=== Subspecies ===
The subspecies of I. exilis have often been confused for other closely related species. There are four known subspecies of I. exilis : I.e. exilis, I.e.poensis, I.e. cerophagus and I.e. pachyrhychus. These subspecies were initially thought to be the same as each other, however it came to researchers attention that they were in-fact separate. Even now there is some inconsistencies about the distribution and division of the subspecies.

Known slight physical differences between the subspecies are as follows:

I.e. exilis - Wings edged in part with a slightly more bronze colouration than those of I.e. cerophagus

I.e. cerophagus - paler and more yellow in colour than I.e. exilis, and wings have edged parts in a more yellow hue

I.e. parchyrhychus - darker neck and back than I.e. cerophagus

== Range and Habitat ==
Indicator exilis is most commonly found in forested areas, including tree plantations, primary and secondary forests, and forest shrub mosaics throughout its range in sub-Saharan Africa. It is found from Guinea-Bissau to South Sudan and southwards to Angola and Zambia. This species is often found in close proximity to bee's nests. The species has been found at elevations up to 1600m.

In total, I. exilis can be found in Angola; Burundi; Cameroon; Central African Republic, the Congo, The Democratic Republic of the Côte d'Ivoire, Equatorial Guinea, Gabon, Ghana, Guinea, Guinea-Bissau, Kenya, Liberia, Nigeria, Rwanda, Senegal, Sierra Leone, South Sudan, Sudan, Tanzania, United Republic of Togo, Uganda and Zambia.

== Lifespan and Development ==
Little is known about the lifespan and development of I. exilis in particular, but it may be similar to that of other closely related honeyguides.

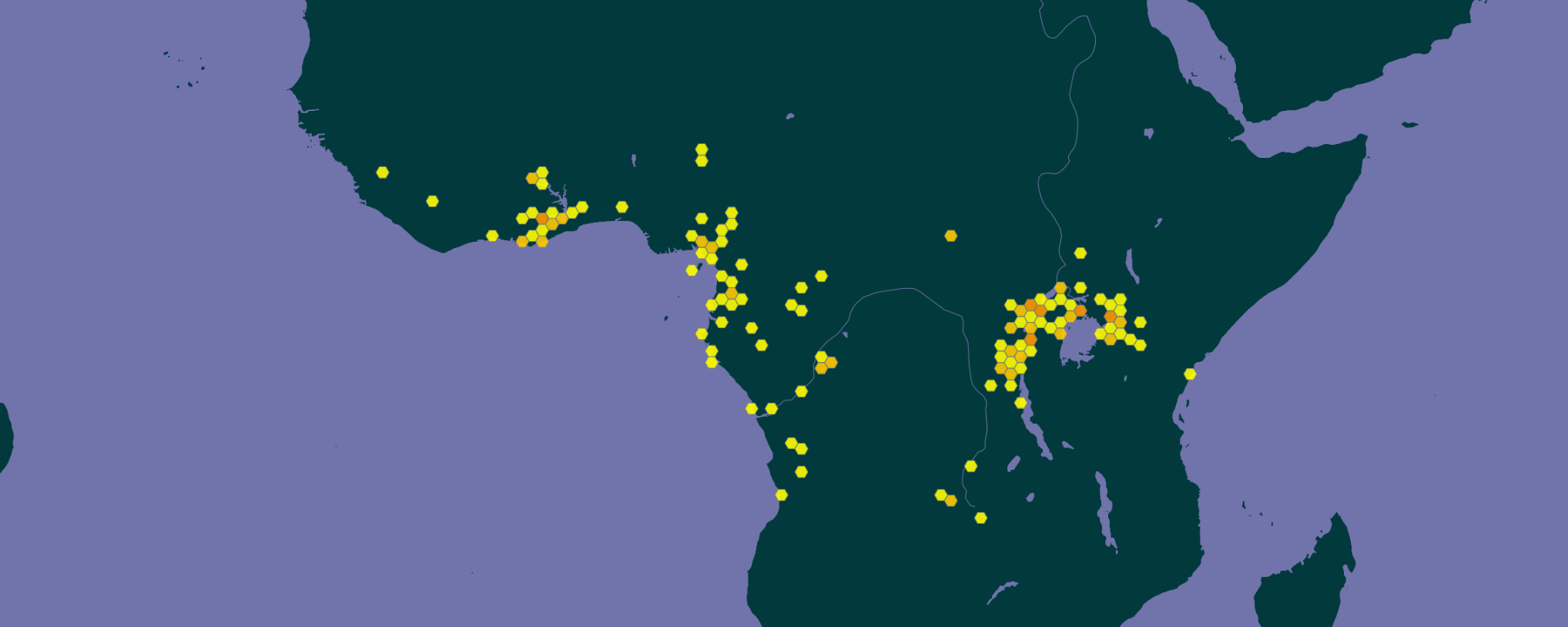
GBIF generated mapped occurrences of I. exilis retrieved from gbif.org on October 1st 2023

== Behaviour and Communication ==
The call of the least honeyguide is a repeated "chreeya" like sound. This recordings of this call can be found in the database Xeno-Canto.

Honeyguides are named for the few species in the Indicator family that have been seen to lead humans to bee hives. While the least honeyguide has not been recorded displaying this behaviour, it does eat bee's wax and larvae like its human-guiding relatives.

== Food Habits ==
The least honeyguide's diet is widely varied. This small bird will eat bees wax, bee and fly eggs and larva, as well as particular insects and fruit. The species spends approximately 66 minutes at a time feeding, with several individuals feeding together at times.

== Reproduction ==
Timing of the breeding season if the least honeyguide is impacted by the region it is found in. birds located in Liberia tend to mate August through March, February through May in Cameroon, and January through June in Zaire. The birds are territorial and defend their singing territories.

Members of the family Indicatoridae are known to be nest parasites, leaving their eggs in the nests of other species to be raised. At times the female honeyguide will destroy any other eggs in that nest to give her own offspring the best chance of care from the nest parents.

== Ecosystem Role and Niche ==
Little is known about the ecosystem role and niche of I. exilis.

== Conservation status ==
The Least honey guide has been classified in 2016 as "Least Concern" by the IUCN Red List of Threatened Species. Population trends for the species are unknown, and little is known about the species population details though it is not believed to be declining rapidly. I. exilis has a very large range and does not appear vulnerable under the range size criterion. It has been called "widespread, but not common" throughout its range.

== Economic Significance ==
There is little known of any economic significance of the least honeyguide.

== Specimen and Sequence Information ==
There are two specimens of the least honeyguide recorded in the Barcode of Life Data System (BOLD). Information on this species can be accessed at the Barcode of Life Database website, under TaxID: 115404.

Both of these specimens were acquired from the country of Gabon. One is currently held in the Smithsonian Institution, National Museum of Natural History in Washington, and the other is found in the Civic Museum of Natural History in Carmagnola.

As well, the National Center for Biotechnology Information (NCBI) has assigned I. exilis a taxonomy ID number (Taxonomy ID 381870). There are seven genomic sequences, as well as six protein sequences available in this database for the species, providing detailed genomic information on the species. More information on the species is available through this database.

== Additional Taxonomic Information ==
Additional information on the taxonomy of I. exilis can be found below under the links seen in the Taxon Identifiers box.
