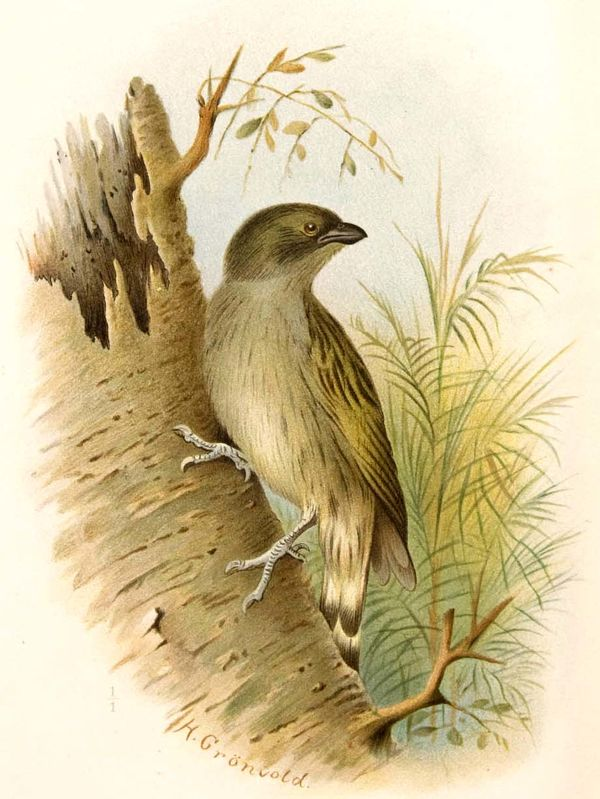

Conservation status
- Least Concern (IUCN 3.1)

Scientific classification
- Kingdom: Animalia
- Phylum: Chordata
- Class: Aves
- Order: Piciformes
- Family: Indicatoridae
- Genus: Indicator
- Species: I. willcocksi

Binomial name
- Indicator willcocksi Alexander, 1901

= Willcocks's honeyguide =

Species of bird

Willcocks's honeyguide (Indicator willcocksi) is a species of bird in the family Indicatoridae. It is found mainly throughout the African tropical rainforest.

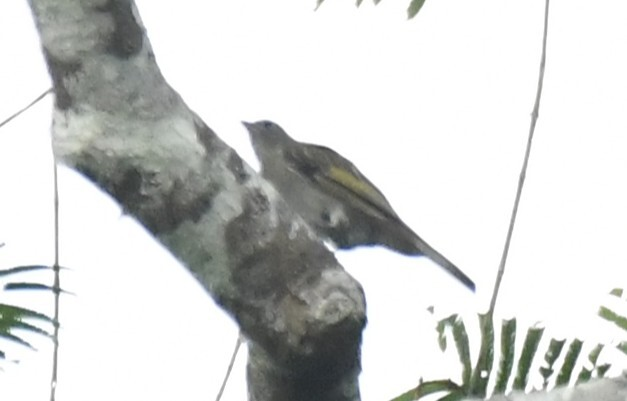
On branch

The common name and Latin binomial commemorate the General Sir James Willcocks.
