= Lyre-tailed honeyguide =

Conservation status
- Least Concern (IUCN 3.1)

Scientific classification
- Kingdom: Animalia
- Phylum: Chordata
- Class: Aves
- Order: Piciformes
- Family: Indicatoridae
- Genus: Melichneutes; Reichenow, 1910
- Species: M. robustus

Binomial name
- Melichneutes robustus (Bates, 1909)

Species of bird

The lyre-tailed honeyguide (Melichneutes robustus) is a species of bird in the family Indicatoridae. It is monotypic within the genus Melichneutes. It is found in the African tropical rainforest of Angola, Cameroon, Central African Republic, Republic of the Congo, Democratic Republic of the Congo, Equatorial Guinea, Gabon, Nigeria, Uganda and west of the Dahomey Gap in Guinea, Sierra Leone, Liberia, Ivory Coast and Ghana.
