= Michel Louette =

Belgian ornithologist and author

Michel Louette is a Belgian ornithologist and author. He is the head of the Department of Ornithology at the Royal Museum for Central Africa, in Tervuren, Belgium. He has described five bird species new to science: three from the Democratic Republic of Congo, one from Liberia and one from the Comoros archipelago. Louette has written several books on ornithology including The Birds of Katanga published in 2010 by the Royal Museum for Central Africa.
