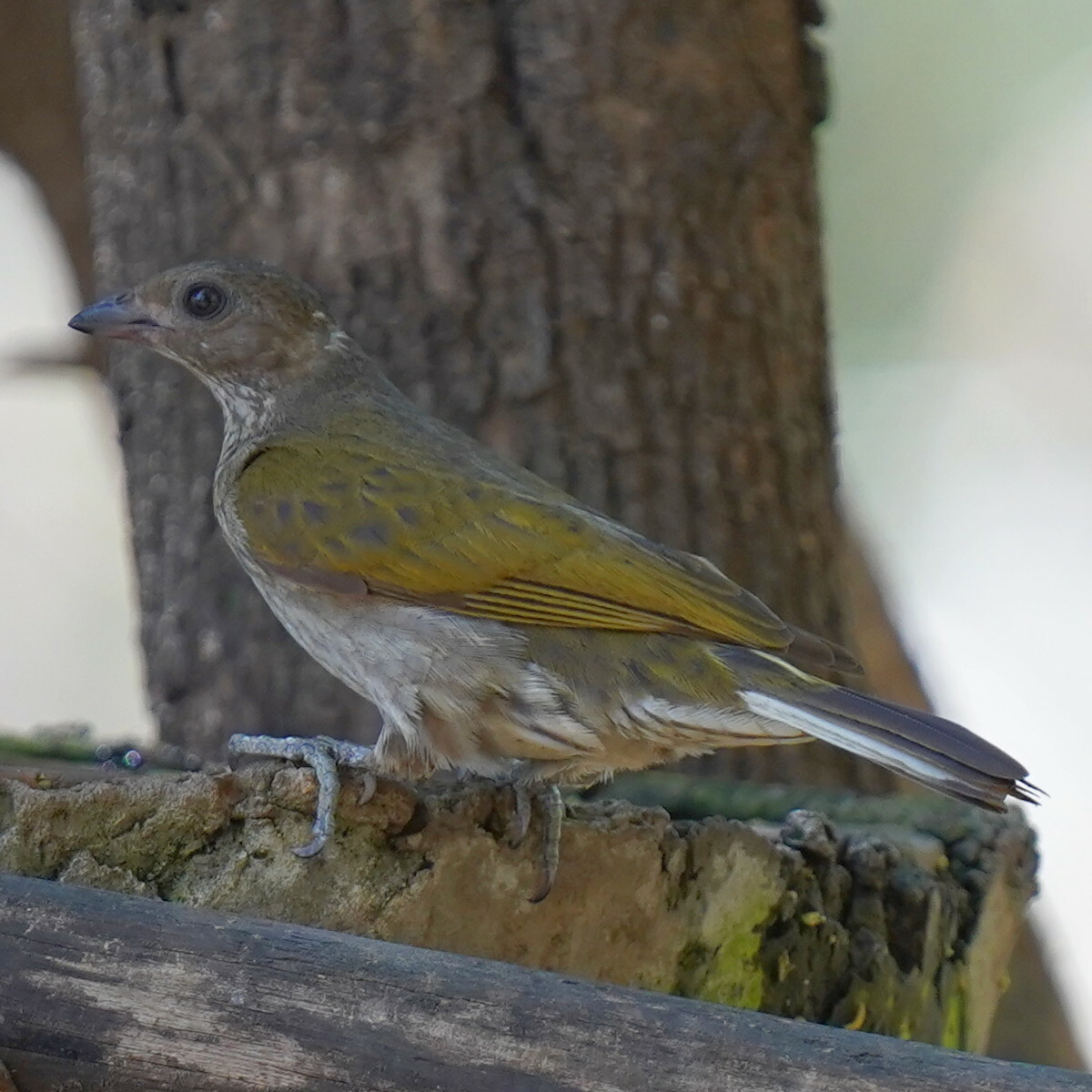

Conservation status
- Least Concern (IUCN 3.1)

Scientific classification
- Kingdom: Animalia
- Phylum: Chordata
- Class: Aves
- Order: Piciformes
- Family: Indicatoridae
- Genus: Indicator
- Species: I. maculatus

Binomial name
- Indicator maculatus Gray, GR, 1847

= Spotted honeyguide =

Species of bird

The spotted honeyguide (Indicator maculatus) is a species of bird in the family Indicatoridae. It is found in Angola, Benin, Cameroon, Central African Republic, Republic of the Congo, Democratic Republic of the Congo, Ivory Coast, Equatorial Guinea, Gabon, Gambia, Ghana, Guinea, Guinea-Bissau, Liberia, Mali, Nigeria, Senegal, Sierra Leone, South Sudan, Togo, and Uganda.
