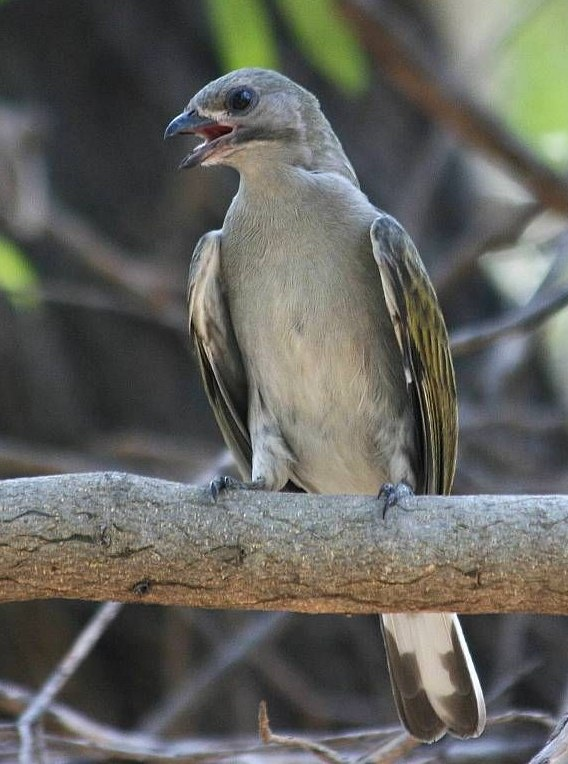

Conservation status
- Least Concern (IUCN 3.1)

Scientific classification
- Kingdom: Animalia
- Phylum: Chordata
- Class: Aves
- Order: Piciformes
- Family: Indicatoridae
- Genus: Indicator
- Species: I. minor

Binomial name
- Indicator minor Stephens, 1815

= Lesser honeyguide =

Species of bird

The lesser honeyguide (Indicator minor) is a species of bird in the family Indicatoridae that is widely distributed across sub-Saharan Africa. Like other honeyguides, it is a brood parasite that lays eggs most commonly in the nests of African barbets, but will also occasionally use the nests of other birds as well, such as starlings and woodpeckers.

== Taxonomy ==
The lesser honeyguide was formally described in 1815 by the English naturalist James Francis Stephens under the binomial name Indicator minor. Stephens based his account on "Le petit indicator" that had been described and illustrated in 1806 by the French naturalist François Levaillant based on specimens collected near the Swartkops River in the Eastern Cape province of South Africa.

Eight subspecies are recognised:

- I. m. conirostris (Cassin, 1856) – Nigeria to west Kenya, DR Congo and west Angola
- I. m. senegalensis Neumann, 1908 – Senegal and Gambia to north Cameroon, Chad and west Sudan
- I. m. riggenbachi Zedlitz, 1915 – central Cameroon to southwest Sudan and west Uganda
- I. m. diadematus Rüppell, 1837 – central Sudan, Ethiopia and north Somalia
- I. m. teitensis Neumann, 1900 – southeast Sudan and Somalia to Zimbabwe and central Mozambique
- I. m. damarensis (Roberts, 1928) – south Angola to central Namibia
- I. m. minor Stephens, 1815 – south Namibia, south Botswana and south Mozambique to South Africa

== Range ==
The lesser honeyguide is widely distributed across sub-Saharan Africa.

== Gallery ==
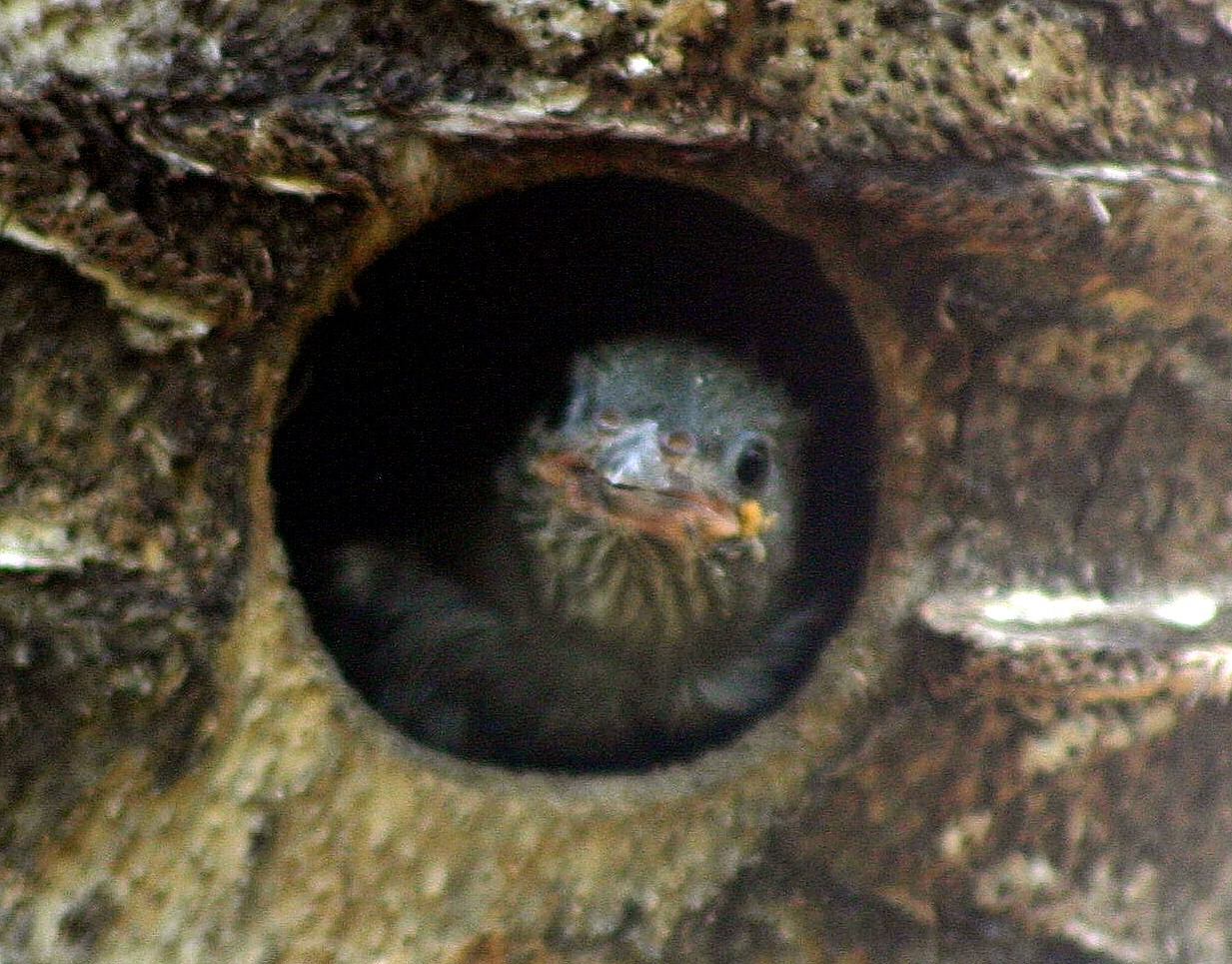
The brood parasite nestling, here peeking from the nest of a black-collared barbet, waiting to be fed
