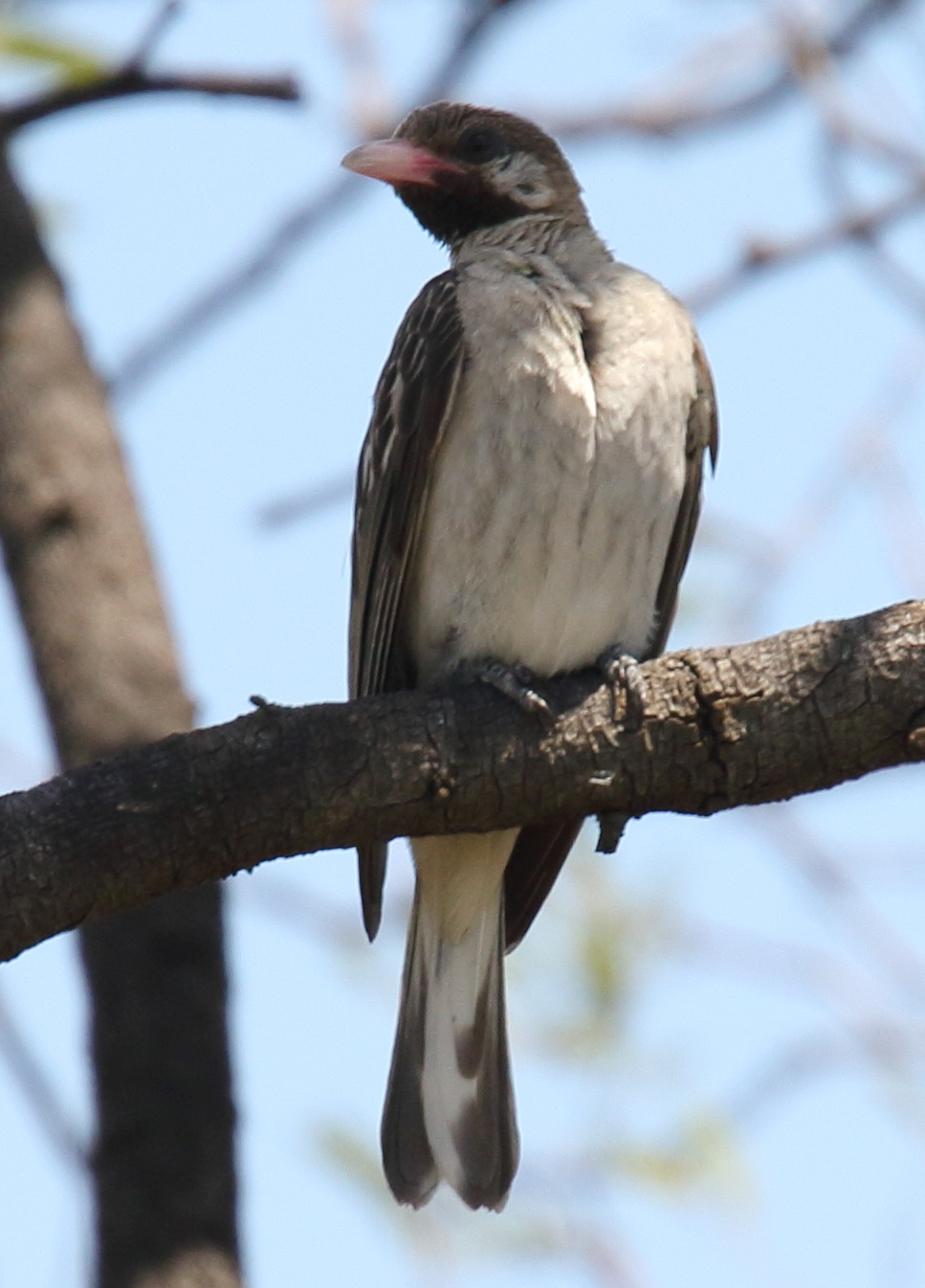
- Adult male in Tanzania

Conservation status
- Least Concern (IUCN 3.1)

Scientific classification
- Kingdom: Animalia
- Phylum: Chordata
- Class: Aves
- Order: Piciformes
- Family: Indicatoridae
- Genus: Indicator
- Species: I. indicator

Binomial name
- Indicator indicator (Sparrman, 1777)

Synonyms
- Cuculus indicator (protonym)

= Greater honeyguide =

Species of bird

The greater honeyguide (Indicator indicator) is a bird in the paleotropical family Indicatoridae, that is related to the woodpeckers. Its English and scientific names refer to its habit of guiding people to bee colonies. Claims that it also guides non-human animals are disputed.

The greater honeyguide is a resident breeder in sub-Saharan Africa. It lives in a variety of habitats with trees, especially dry open woodland, but not in the West African rain forest.

== Description ==
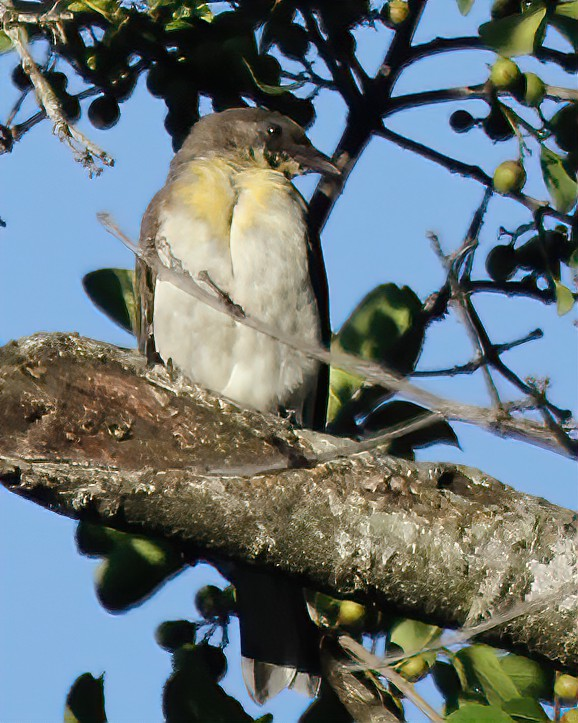
Juvenile in Maasai Mara - Kenya

The greater honeyguide has bold white patches on the sides of the tail, is about 20 cm (7.9 in) long and weighs about 50 g (1.8 oz). The male has a black throat, pink bill, dark grey-brown upperparts and white underparts. The wings are streaked whitish, and the shoulder patch is yellow. The female is duller, has a blackish bill, and her throat is black. Immature birds have olive-brown upperparts with a white rump, yellow throat and upper breast.

== Behaviour and ecology ==
The greater honeyguide is known to guide people to the nests of wild bees. A guiding bird attracts a person's attention with wavering, chattering "'tya' notes compounded with peeps or pipes", sounds it also gives in aggression. The guiding bird flies toward an occupied nest (greater honeyguides know the sites of many bees' nests in their territories) and then stops nearby the nest. Honey-hunters then do a final search for the bee colony, and if deemed suitable, harvest honey from the bee colony through the use of fire and smoke to subdue the bees, and axes and machetes to expose the colony. After harvesting the honey, the honeyguide eats wax that is left.

One study found that use of honeyguides by the Boran people of East Africa reduces their search time for honey by approximately two-thirds. Because of this benefit, the Boran use a specific loud whistle, known as the fuulido, when a search for honey is about to begin. The fuulido doubles the encounter rate with honeyguides. In northern Tanzania, Honeyguides increased the Hadza's rate of finding bee nests by 560%, and led men to significantly higher yielding nests than those found without honeyguides. Another study of the Yao honey-hunters in northern Mozambique showed that the honeyguides responded to the traditional brrrr-hmm call of the honey-hunters. The chances of finding a bee-hive were greatly increased when the traditional call was used. That study reported anecdotes from Yao honey-hunters that adult but not juvenile honeyguides respond to the specific honey-hunting calls.

In African folklore, it is frequently noted that the honeyguide should be thanked with a gift of honey; if not, it may lead its follower to a lion, bull elephant, or venomous snake as punishment. However, "others maintain that honeycomb spoils the bird, and leave it to find its own bits of comb". While many depictions of the human-honeyguide mutualism emphasize honey-hunters graciously repaying the birds with piles of wax left in a conspicuous location, such behavior is not universal. The Hadza people of northern Tanzania frequently burn, bury, or hide the wax that lays with the intent of keeping the bird hungry, and more likely to guide again. Some greater honeyguides have stopped this guiding behavior, or mutualism, in parts of Kenya, and this is thought to be due to a loss of response from people in the area.

A study done in 2025 found that sometimes honeyguides do lead humans to animals that are not bees, such as snakes. However the researchers think that this is probably due to error by the birds and not punitive behavior.

=== Possible guiding of animals ===
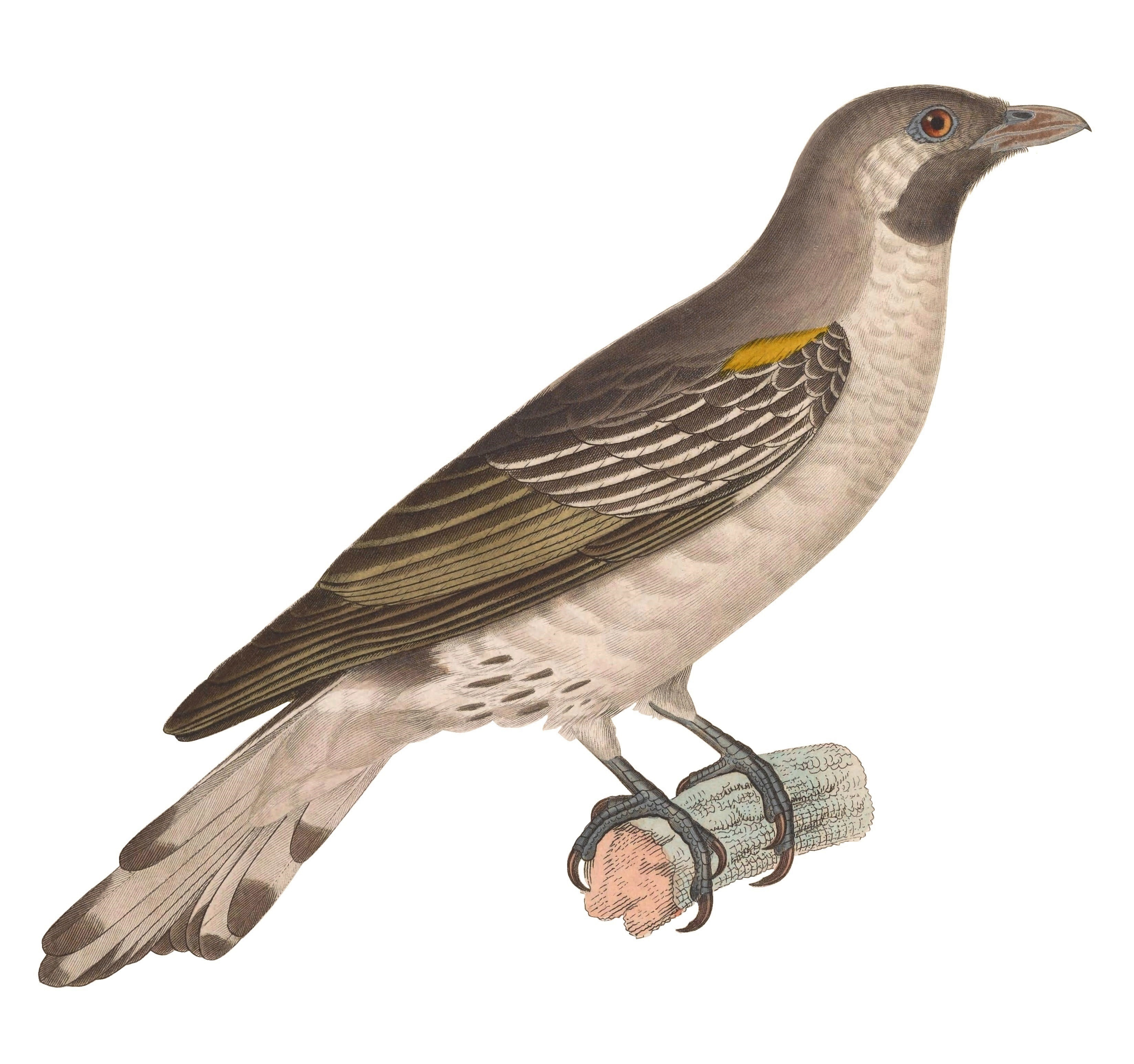
Adult male illustrated by Nicolas Huet

Guiding call near Pretoria, South Africa

Many sources say that this species also guides honey badgers. Sparrman noted in the 18th century that indigenous Africans reported this interaction, but Friedmann adds that no biologist has seen it. Friedmann quotes reports that greater honeyguides guide baboons and speculates that the behavior evolved in relation to these species before the appearance of humanity. However, they state,

In addition to that listed by Friedmann (1955:41-47), the only recent record is of a greater honeyguide giving its guiding call to baboons at Wankie Game Reserve, Zimbabwe (C. J. Vernon, pers. comm.). However, Vernon did not see a positive response by the baboons to the honeyguide. No additional records of honeyguides and ratels have been reported since Friedmann (1955) and the first-hand accounts given in his review in support of this association are all of incomplete guiding sequences. No biologist has ever reported this association.

Honeyguides are thought to guide other animals, a behavior that may have evolved with "early human". Later studies estimate that interaction between honeyguides and honey badgers likely occurs, "but is highly localized or extremely difficult to observe, or both". It has also been acknowledged that bee colonies are seasonally very common in Africa and ratels probably have no trouble finding them.

Another argument against guiding of non-human animals is that near cities, where people increasingly buy sugar rather than hunting for wild honey, guiding behavior is disappearing. Ultimately, it may disappear everywhere.

=== Diet ===
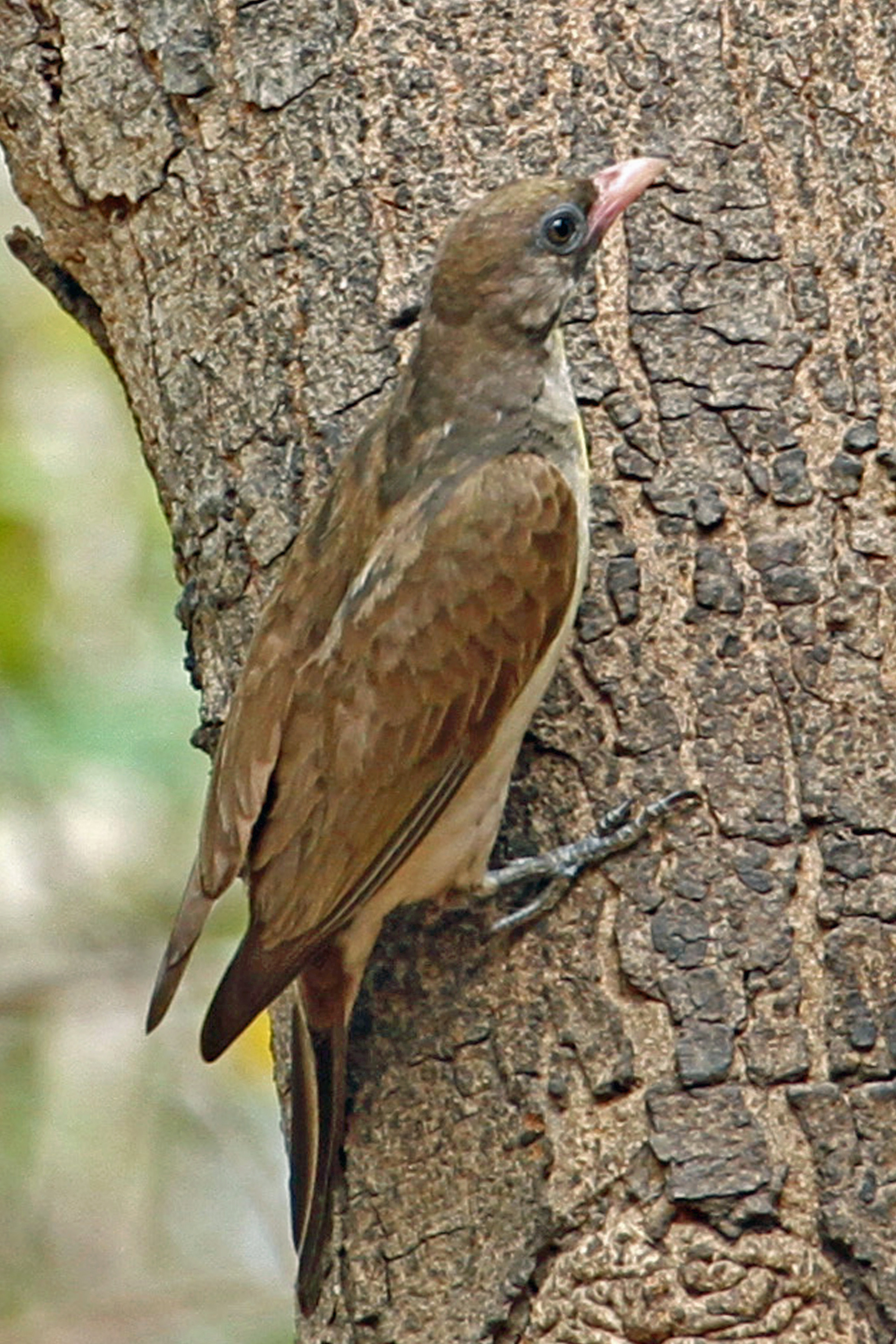
Immature male in The Gambia

The greater honeyguide feeds primarily on the contents of bee colonies: beeswax, eggs, larvae and pupae; as well as waxworms and insect wings of flying swarming colonies. It enters bees' nests while the bees are torpid in the early morning, feeds at abandoned hives and scavenges at hives robbed by people or other large animals, notably the honey badger.

It frequently associates with other honeyguides at bees' nests; immatures dominate adults, and immatures of this species dominate all others. It occasionally will eat fruit and will rarely consume bird eggs. Young greater honeyguides thrive predominantly on fruit that the host parents bring.

=== Reproduction ===
The greater honeyguide is a brood parasite. It lays white eggs in series of 3 to 7, for a total of 10 to 20 in a year. Each egg is laid in a different nest of a bird of another species, including some woodpeckers, barbets, kingfishers, bee-eaters, wood hoopoes, starlings, and large swallows. It is common for the female greater honeyguide to break the host's eggs when laying her own. All the species parasitized nest in holes, covered nests, or deep cup nests. The chick has a membranous hook on the bill that it uses, while still blind and featherless, to kill the host's young outright or by repeated wounds.
