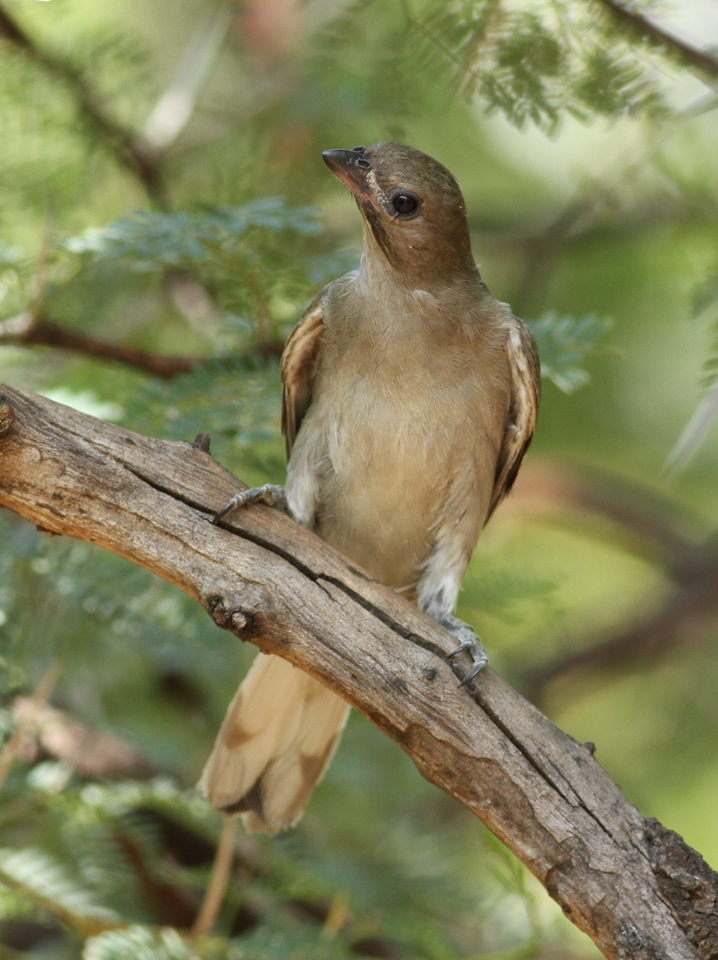
- Lesser honeyguide

Scientific classification
- Kingdom: Animalia
- Phylum: Chordata
- Class: Aves
- Order: Piciformes
- Suborder: Pici
- Infraorder: Picides
- Family: Indicatoridae; Swainson, 1837

Genera
- Indicator; Melichneutes; Melignomon; Prodotiscus

= Honeyguide =

Family of near passerine birds

Honeyguides (family Indicatoridae) are a family of 16 species of birds in the order Piciformes. They are also known as indicator birds, or honey birds, although the latter term is also used more narrowly to refer to species of the genus Prodotiscus. They have an Old World tropical distribution, with the greatest number of species in Africa and two in Asia. These birds are best known for their interaction with humans. Honeyguides are noted and named from one or two species that will deliberately lead humans directly to bee colonies, so that they can feast on the grubs and beeswax that are left behind. Interaction between honeyguides and honey badgers has also been reported.

== Taxonomy ==
The Indicatoridae were noted for their barbet-like structure and brood-parasitic behaviour and morphologically considered unique among the non-passerines in having nine primaries. The phylogenetic relationship between the honeyguides and the eight other families that make up the order Piciformes is shown in the cladogram below. The number of species in each family is taken from the list maintained by Frank Gill, Pamela C. Rasmussen and David Donsker on behalf of the International Ornithological Committee (IOC).

- Piciformes
  - - Galbulidae – jacamars (18 species)
    - Bucconidae – puffbirds (38 species)
  - - - Indicatoridae – honeyguides (16 species)
      - Picidae – woodpeckers (240 species)
    - - Megalaimidae – Asian barbets (35 species)
      - - Lybiidae – African barbets (42 species)
        - - Capitonidae – New World barbets (15 species)
          - - Semnornithidae – toucan barbets (2 species)
            - Ramphastidae – toucans (43 species)

== Description ==
Most honeyguides are dull greenish-brown, though some (notably yellow-rumped honeyguide from the Himalaya) have bright yellow patches in the plumage. All have light outer tail feathers, white in all the African species, and pale grey in the Asian species. The smallest species by body mass appears to be the green-backed honeyguide, at an average of 10.2 g (0.36 oz), and by length appears to be the Cassin's honeyguide, at an average of 10 cm (3.9 in), while the largest species by weight is the lyre-tailed honeyguide, at 54.2 g (1.91 oz), and by length, is the greater honeyguide, at 19.5 cm (7.7 in).

They are among the few birds that feed regularly on wax; beeswax in most species, and presumably the waxy secretions of scale insects in the genus Prodotiscus and to a lesser extent in Melignomon and the smaller species of Indicator. They also feed on waxworms, the larvae of the waxmoth Galleria mellonella, on bee colonies, and on flying and crawling insects, spiders, and occasional fruit. Many species join mixed-species feeding flocks.

== Behaviour ==
=== Guiding ===
Honeyguides are named from the remarkable habit seen in one or two species of guiding humans to bee colonies, although most members of the family are not known to do this, they are all referred to as "honeyguides" by linguistic extrapolation. Once the hive has been opened and the honey is taken, the bird feeds on larvae and wax. This behaviour has been studied in the greater honeyguide; some authorities (following Friedmann, 1955) state that it also occurs in the scaly-throated honeyguide, while others disagree. Wild honeyguides understand various types of human calls that attract them to engage in the foraging mutualism. In northern Tanzania, honeyguides partner with Hadza hunter-gatherers, and the bird assistance has been shown to increase honey-hunters' rates of finding bee colonies by 560%, and led men to significantly higher yielding nests than those found without honeyguides. The Hadza may not actively repay honeyguides, but instead hide or destroy the honeycomb, in order to keep the bird hungry and more likely to guide them in future. Some experts believe that honeyguide co-evolution with humans goes back to the stone-tool making human ancestor Homo erectus, about 1.9 million years ago.

There has been controversy around the question of whether honeyguides guide the honey badger; though videos about this exist, there have been accusations that they were staged. In research published by the Zoological Society of London in 2023, the authors concluded: "Many interviewees in the Hadzabe, Maasai and mixed culture communities in Tanzania reported having seen honey badgers and honeyguides interact, and think that they do cooperate. This complementary approach suggests that the most likely scenario is that the interaction does occur but is highly localised or extremely difficult to observe, or both."

Sometimes, honeyguides lead humans to animals that are not bees, such as snakes. The reason for this behaviour is not clear.

Honeyguides also attack bee nests without human or animal assistance. They have thick skin which gives them limited protection from bee stings, although they are not immune, and can easily be killed by bees; to avoid this, they visit bee nests in the early morning when it is cool, and the bees are less active. Much of their wax is also obtained from abandoned bee nests.

=== Breeding ===
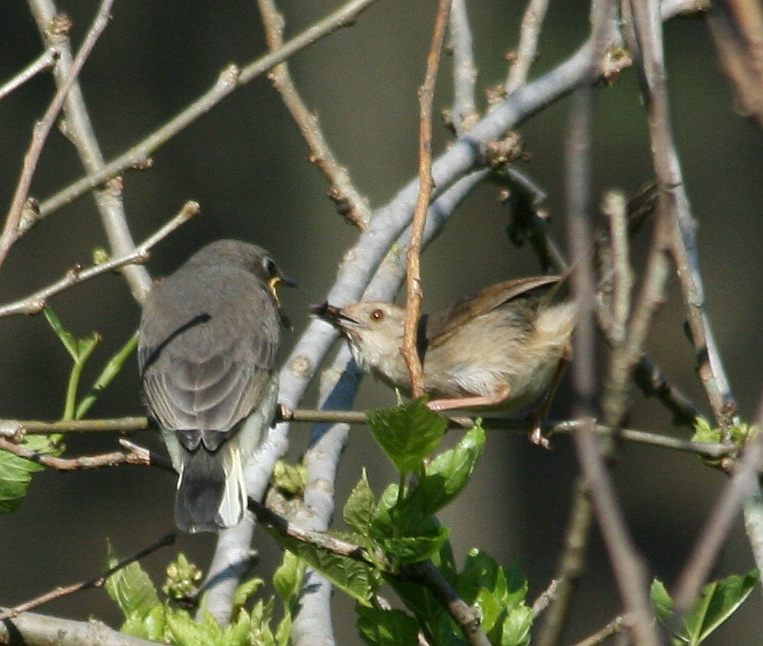
Brown-backed honeybird juvenile fed by host parent, a rock-loving cisticola

The breeding behaviour of eight species in Indicator and Prodotiscus is known. They are all brood parasites that lay one egg in a nest of another species, laying eggs in series of about five during a period of 5–7 days. Most favour hole-nesting species, often the related barbets and woodpeckers, but Prodotiscus parasitise cup-nesters such as white-eyes and warblers. Honeyguide nestlings have been known to physically eject their hosts' chicks from the nests and they have needle-sharp hooks on their beaks with which they puncture the hosts' eggs or kill the nestlings.

African honeyguide birds are known to lay their eggs in underground nests of other bee-eating bird species. The honeyguide chicks kill the hatchlings of the host using their needle-sharp beaks just after hatching (unlike cuckoo hatchlings, which push the host young out of the nest). The honeyguide mother ensures her chick hatches first by internally incubating the egg for an extra day before laying it, so that it has a head start in development compared to the hosts' offspring.

== See also ==
- List of honeyguides
