= Munzur Valley National Park =

National park in Turkey

- Munzur Vadisi Milli Parkı
- IUCN category II (national park)
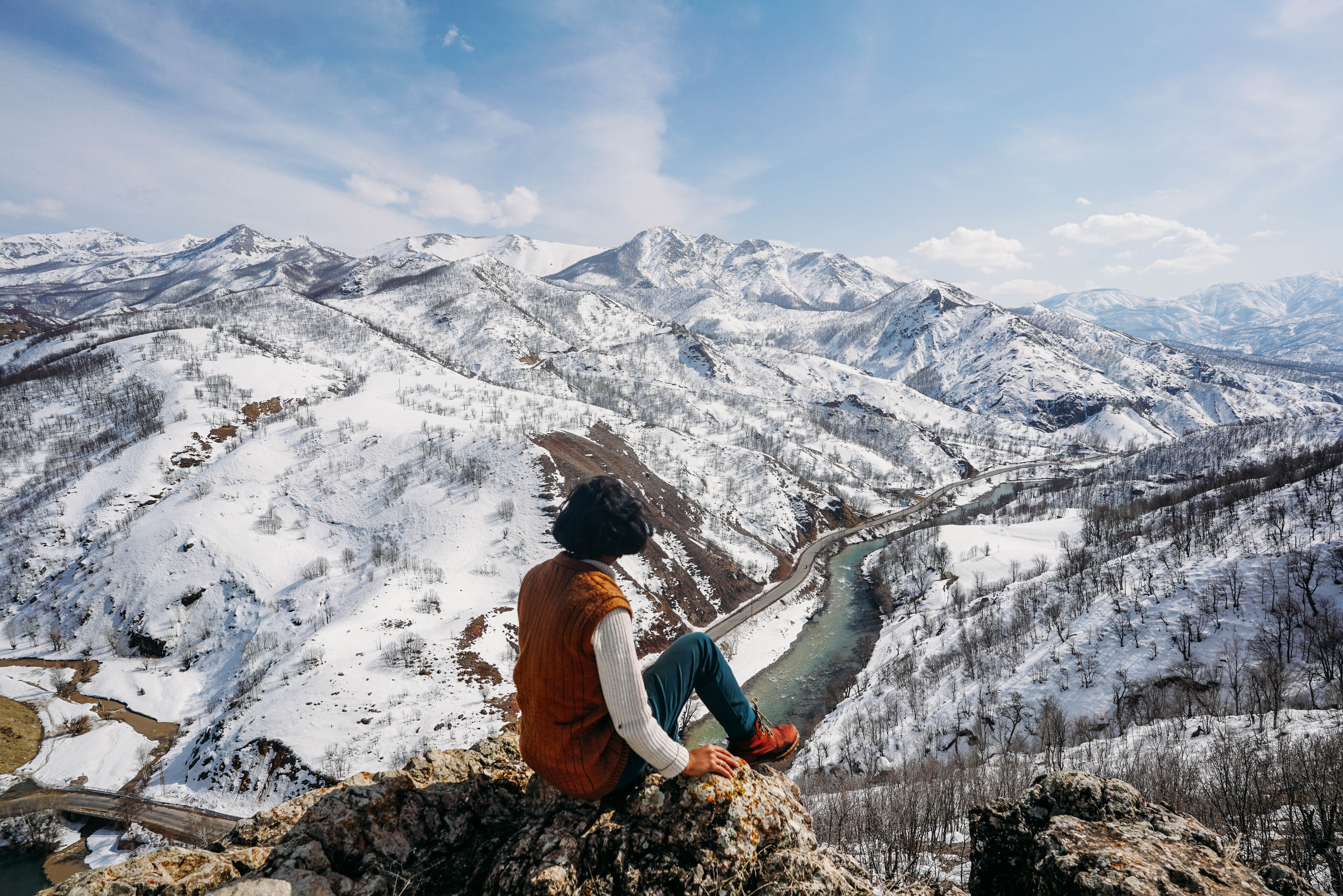

- Location within Turkey
- Location: Tunceli Province, Turkey
- Nearest city: Tunceli
- Coordinates: 39°16′37″N 039°17′33″E
- Area: 420 km^{2} (160 sq mi)
- Established: December 21, 1971; 54 years ago
- Governing body: Directorate-General of Nature Protection and National Parks; Ministry of Environment and Forest

The Munzur Valley National Park (Turkish: Munzur Vadisi Milli Parkı), established on December 21, 1971, is the largest and the most biodiverse national park in Turkey. It is located at the Munzur Valley of Munzur Mountain Range within Tunceli Province in eastern Anatolia.

The Munzur Valley National Park, part of the Eastern Anatolian deciduous forests ecoregion, is one of the richest floristic areas of Anatolia. The national park was established to protect the region's wildlife and scenic beauty.

The protected area is administered by the Directorate-General of Nature Protection and National Parks (Turkish: Doğa Koruma ve Milli Parklar Genel Müdürlüğü) of the Ministry of Environment and Forest, although even outside of the administered area the landscape is very well preserved. A large part of this may be due to the Alevi inhabitants of the region, who respect nature as part of their religious beliefs.

== Geography ==
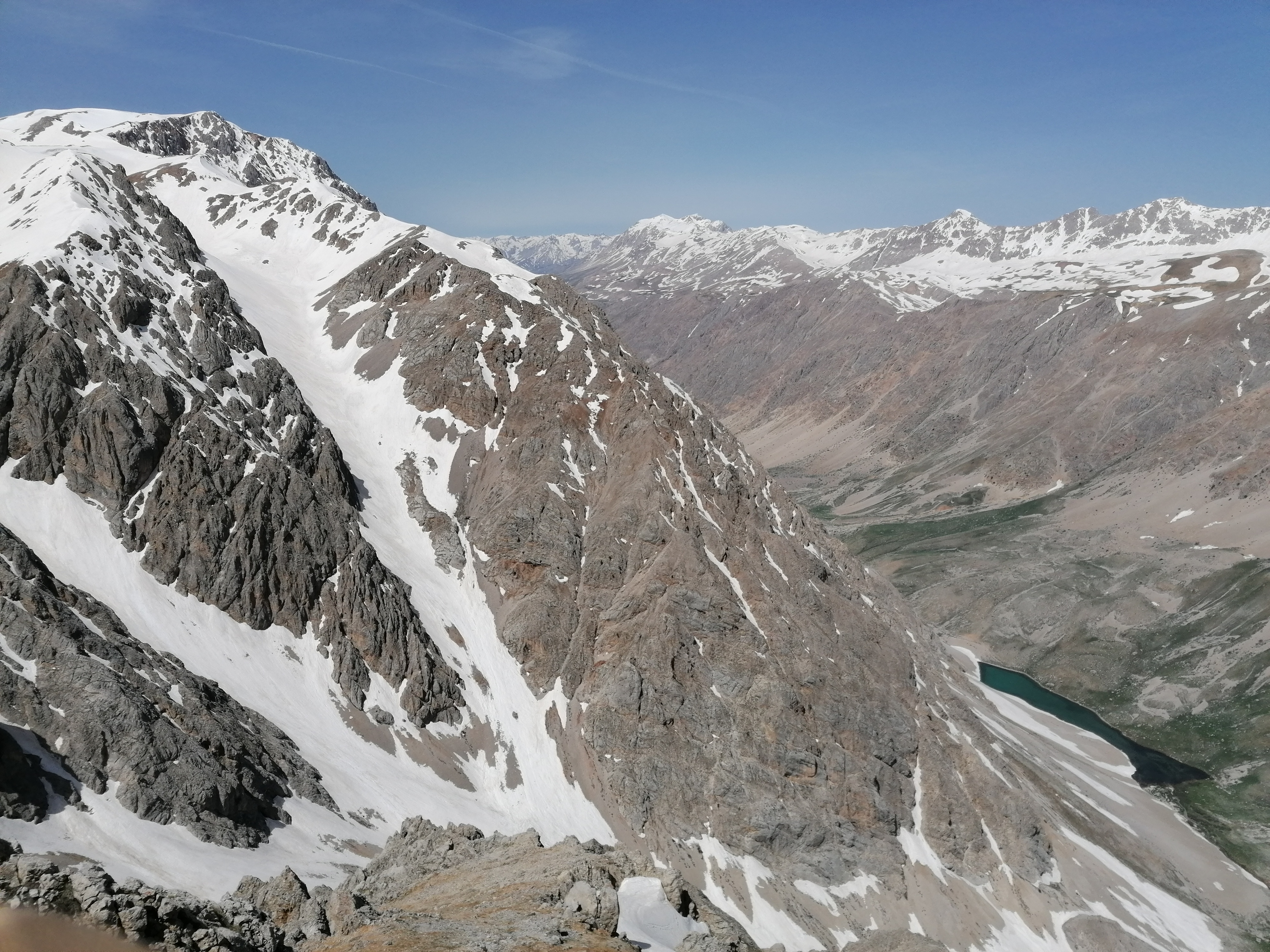
View of Munzur Valley

The national park is situated between 8 km (5.0 mi) northwest from the city center of Tunceli and Ovacık town, which is at a distance of 65 km (40 mi) from the provincial capital. It extends along the Munzur Valley to the Munzur Mountains, which rise up to 3,300 m (10,800 ft) high Amsl in the north. The park spans an area of 420 km^{2} (160 sq mi).

== Geology ==
The geological structure of the Munzur Mountains, which rise up between the Karasu and Murat dells, consists of sedimentary, volcanic, and intrusive rocks that have been metamorphosed. The mountain range is particularly divided by the streams Mercan and Munzur.

There are several caves in the national park. Since they have not been systematically explored, big danger persists that unknown species might become extinct. Many existing travertines and hot springs indicate that Tunceli has a big potential for geothermal energy.

Glacial lakes situated up from the elevations of 1,600 m (5,200 ft) in the Mercan Valley, springs in the Ovacık Plain, canyons and waterfalls along the valleys enrich the natural values of the national park. Lake Karagöl is one of the main Glacial lake in the Munzur Mountains.

== Climate ==
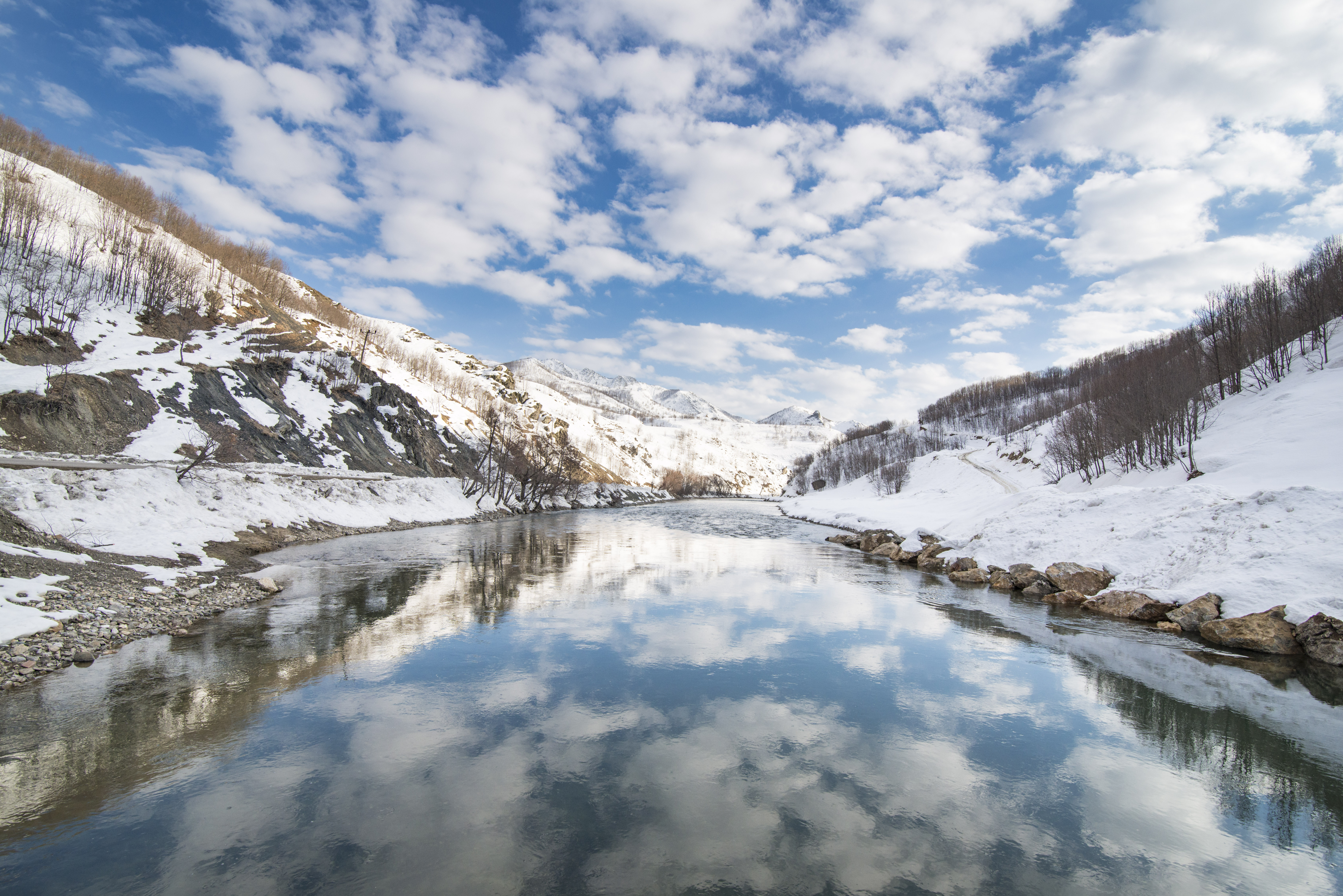
View of Munzur River during winter

The climate of the region is highly influenced by a continental climate with extreme winter temperatures and heavy snowfalls. Precipitation in the Munzur Valley is variable and ranges between 600–1,000 mm (24–39 in) annually.

== Ecosystem ==
=== Flora ===
The Munzur Valley National Park is home to 1,518 registered species of plants, of which 43 are endemic to the national park and 227 are endemic to Turkey. Plants like bellflower, Hypericum, Munzur thyme, Munzur buttercups, mountain tea, Mt. Munzur tansy are endemic to the national park.

Trees and shrubs

Some of the common trees in the national park, which are found in mixed forests, are elm, ash, plane tree, grapewine, beech, oak, aspen, populus, willow, Valonia oak, Norway maple, black alder, birch, wild apple, wild pear, walnut, wild hazelnut and cedar. Birch is the characteristic tree in the region that grows on the banks of Munzur River about 1.5 km (0.93 mi) south of Ovacık town. Oak is the dominant tree of the park that covers the non-rocky hills and slopes.

Wild flowering plants

Common wild flowering plants found in the park are tulip, hyacinth, daffodil, common snowdrop, viola, German chamomile, Mexican tea, milk-vetch and wild thyme.

=== Fauna ===
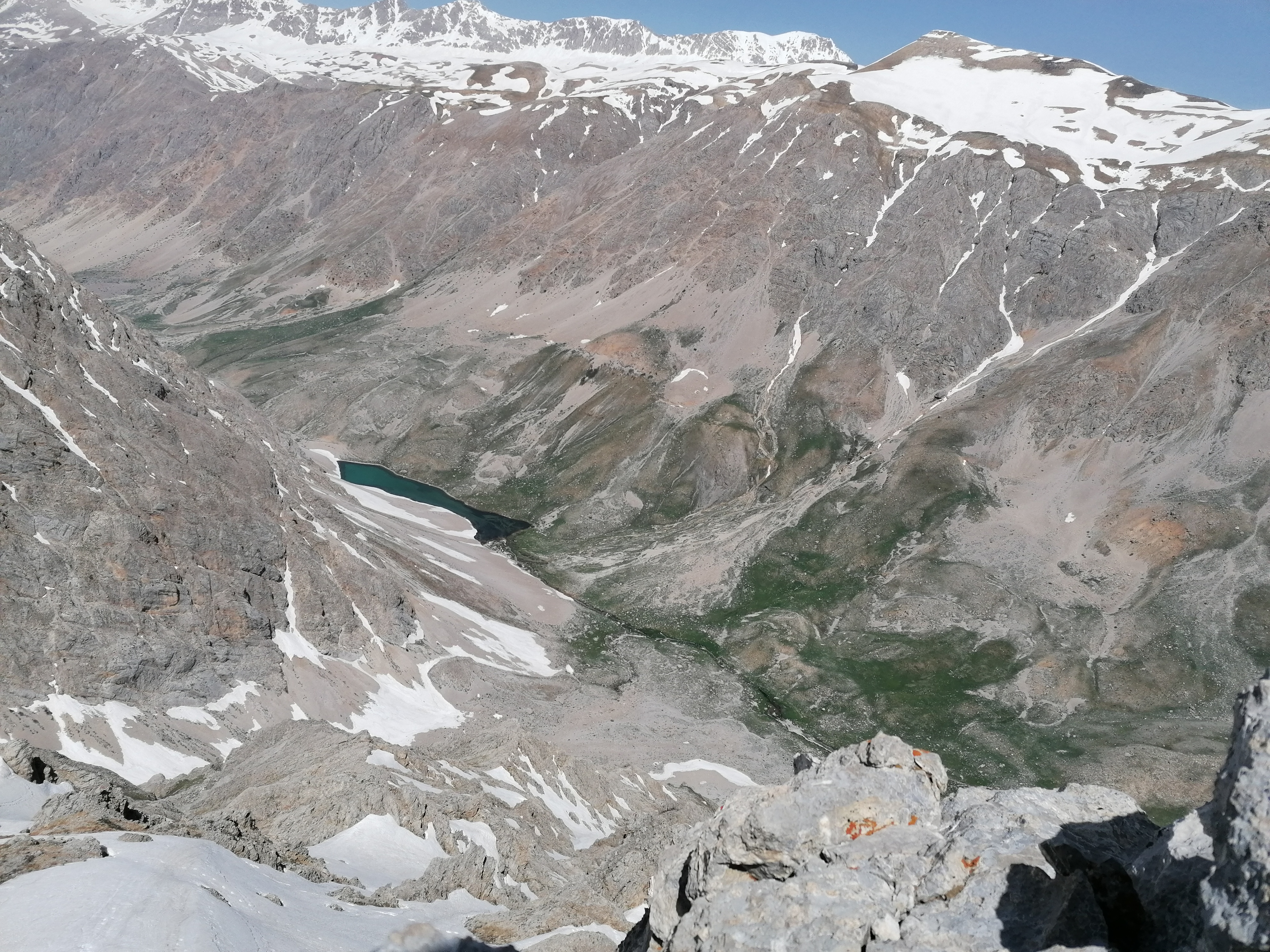
View of Munzur Mountains from the top

The natural environment in the Munzur Valley National Park offers an adequate habitat for wildlife. Several genera of trout living in Munzur River and Mercan River, two subspecies of wild goat, namely chamois and bezoar ibex, and the gamebird Caspian snowcock are examples of the national park's endemic fauna.

An area for protection and breeding of various game animals is reserved in the valley of Munzur River.

Mammals

The park and its surroundings are rich of game animals hunted for food or sports. Most important wildlife inhabiting the Munzur Valley include woolly dormouse, gray wolf, fox, marten, brown bear, wildcat, Eurasian lynx, European otter, European badger, chamois, wild goat, squirrel, hare, wild boar and hedgehog.

The brown bear, living in the rock shelters, is one of the most important large mammals of Munzur Valley's wildlife. Other large mammals of the region are lynx, wild boar and gray wolf, which habitat in the rocky places within the forests.

Birds

The park is quite rich of bird genera. Some heraldic birds of diurnal group found in the region are eagle, vulture, falcon, common buzzard, hawk, kestrel, kite and as an uncommon species the golden eagle. Eurasian eagle-owl, owl and bat are nocturnal species that are common in the area.

Other bird genera include partridge, grey partridge, great bustard, little bustard, crane, common quail, Eurasian woodcock, turtle dove, common wood pigeon and rock pigeon, some duck species and rarely encountered goose.

Threatened species of birds, which are found quite commonly in the national park, are black stork, bearded vulture, Egyptian vulture, griffon vulture, Caspian snowcock, short-toed eagle, golden eagle, long-legged buzzard, eastern imperial eagle, booted eagle, Radde's accentor, Alpine accentor, wallcreeper, Alpine chough and white-winged snowfinch

Fish

Trout that lives in great number in the streams of the national park, makes up an important economic value for the region. The brown trout used to live in the valley.

== Recreation ==
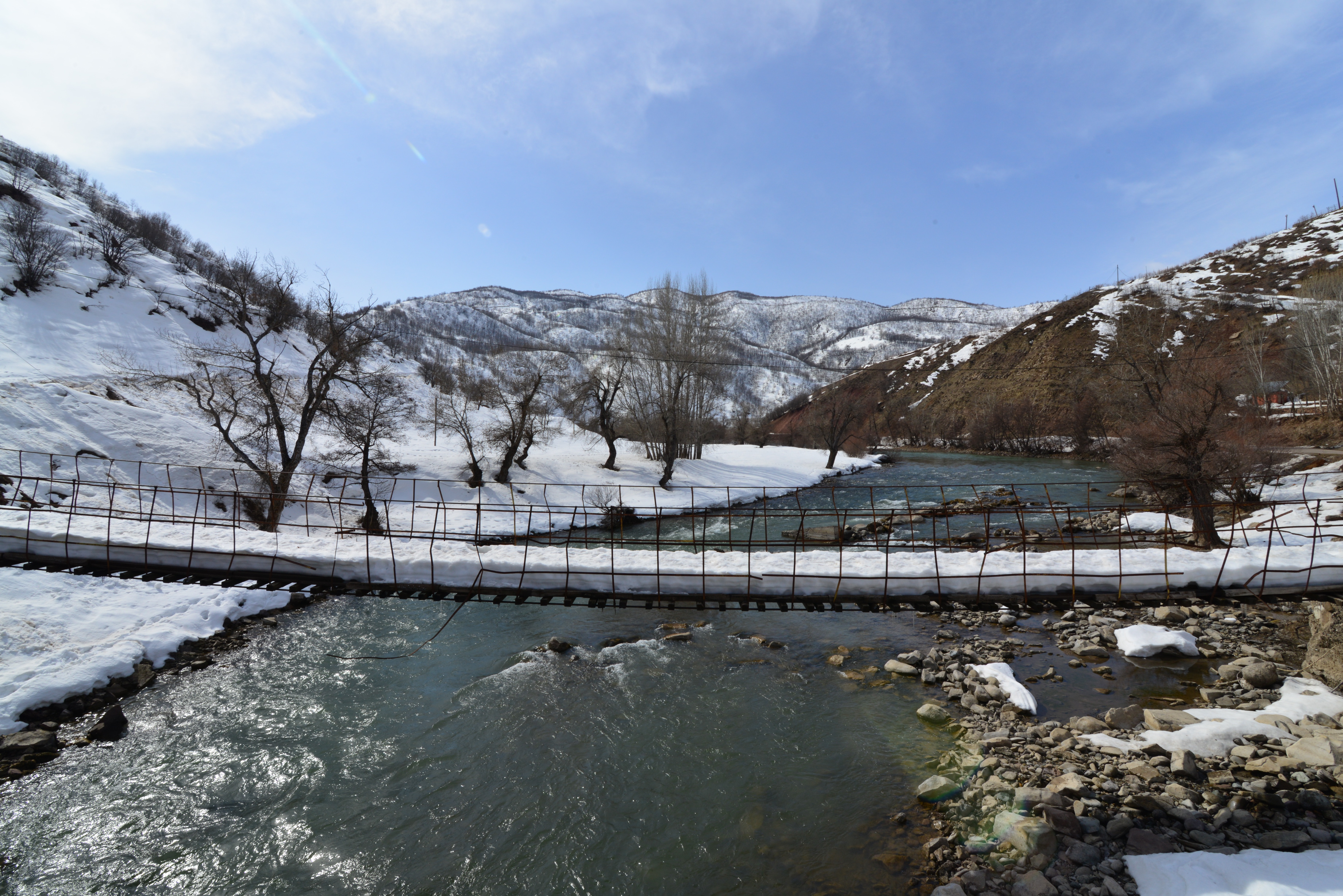
Bridge on the Munzur River

Due to the harsh climate in the region, the time between June 15 and August 27 is the best period for visiting the national park. The park offers opportunities for diverse outdoor and water sports, including rafting and mountaineering in addition to activities like camping, picnicking, sports fishing and hiking.

While the northern part of Mercan Valley is most convenient for tracking and hiking, southern parts are best for camping and picnicking due to the forests in that area.

== Transportation ==
The Munzur Valley National Park's entrance can be reached from the city center of Tunceli by an asphalt road leading to Ovacık along the Munzur River. Transportation to Tunceli is available only by road either from 133 km (83 mi) away Elazığ by D.885 or from 146 km (91 mi) far Erzincan by D.100 (E80) and then D.885. Both neighboring cities have an airport with domestic flights connecting to the international airports of Istanbul and Ankara.

== Dams ==
In 1985, the State Hydraulic Works (DSİ) began with the construction of a dam with hydroelectric power plant on the Mercan River. The hydro dam went in 2003 in service, generating 20 MW. In 2008, the power plant was privatized and was taken over by the Zorlu Holding for a 30-years term. An investigation carried out shortly after the transaction showed that the hydro dam was built within the borders of the national park.

In Tunceli, two dams were built and the construction of further dams have been projected. Following the completion of those dams, the largest portion of the national park will be flooded by the reservoir. The plannings for the dams are accomplished. According to the laws on protection of forests and national parks in Turkey, the construction of dams in such regions is an illegal practice.

The World Wildlife Fund has called for the further protection of the national park's unique ecosystem, which would otherwise be endangered by the ongoing projects.
