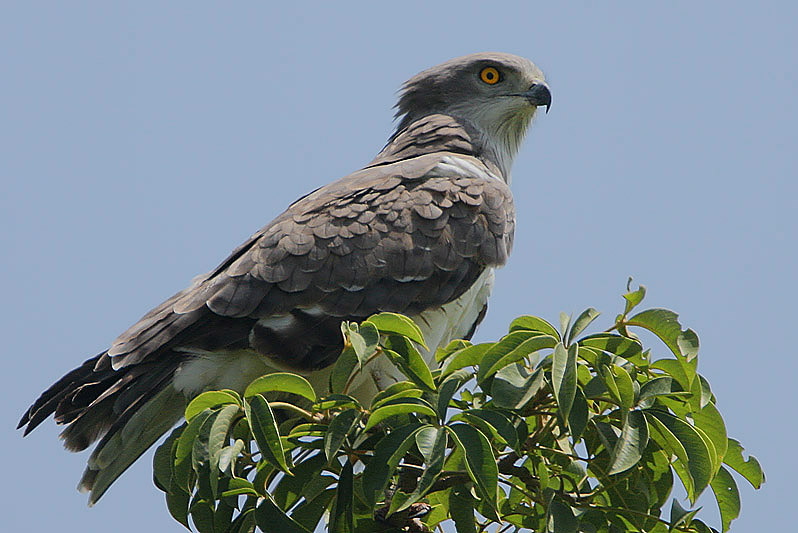
- Perched adult bird near Kampanti, Gambia.

Conservation status
- Vulnerable (IUCN 3.1)

Scientific classification
- Kingdom: Animalia
- Phylum: Chordata
- Class: Aves
- Order: Accipitriformes
- Family: Accipitridae
- Genus: Circaetus
- Species: C. beaudouini

Binomial name
- Circaetus beaudouini Verreaux & Des Murs, 1862

= Beaudouin's snake eagle =

Species of bird

Beaudouin's snake eagle (Circaetus beaudouini) is a species of snake eagle in the family Accipitridae found in the Sahel region of west Africa. It forms a superspecies with the Palearctic short-toed snake eagle Circaetus gallicus and the black-chested snake eagle Circaetus pectoralis. This bird seems to be declining in numbers and the International Union for Conservation of Nature has rated it as a "vulnerable species".

== Description ==
The bird has a wingspan of 170 cm (67 in). A large snake eagle with grey-brown upperparts, including the head and chest, contrasting with white underparts barred with brown and white vent. It has a black bill and large, bright yellow eyes with long pale grey, unfeathered legs. Juveniles are all dark.

== Behaviour ==
Normally seen on a prominent perch such as a telegraph pole or dead tree, as it is a sit-and-wait hunter, rather than in flight but generally behaviour is poorly known. The diet mainly consists of snakes and other small vertebrates. It breeds in November to March in West Africa in a small stick nest at up to 25 m (82 ft) in the top of a tree. The clutch is usually a single egg. Incubation period is probably around 45 days with a fledging period which may be a further 70 days.

== Habitat ==
Open woodlands, wooded savanna and cultivation.

== Distribution ==
In a narrow band from Guinea-Bissau, Senegal and Gambia through southern Mali and Burkina Faso, Niger, northern Nigeria and Cameroon, southern Chad, Central African Republic and South Sudan. It has been recorded in Uganda but its status is uncertain in Kenya. There may be some nomadic movements, it appears to move southwards during the dry season and northwards during the rains.

== Status ==
This bird is nowhere common and has been little studied. The total population is thought to be between 3,500 and 15,000 individuals. It is threatened by the results of the rising human populations in the Sahel regions. This brings about more deforestation, increase in the area under cultivation and an associated increase in the use of pesticides, overgrazing, urbanization and increased hunting pressure. Raptors are seeing declines in their populations and this species appears to be decreasing in numbers and is categorised as Vulnerable by the International Union for Conservation of Nature.

== Taxonomic note ==
Along with the black-chested snake eagle often treated as a subspecies of the short-toed eagle because of reports of mixed pairings and because Beaudouin's snake eagle is intermediate in plumage between short-toed eagle and black-chested snake-eagle. However, plumage differences are significant enough for all three to be currently regarded as three separate species within a single superspecies.
