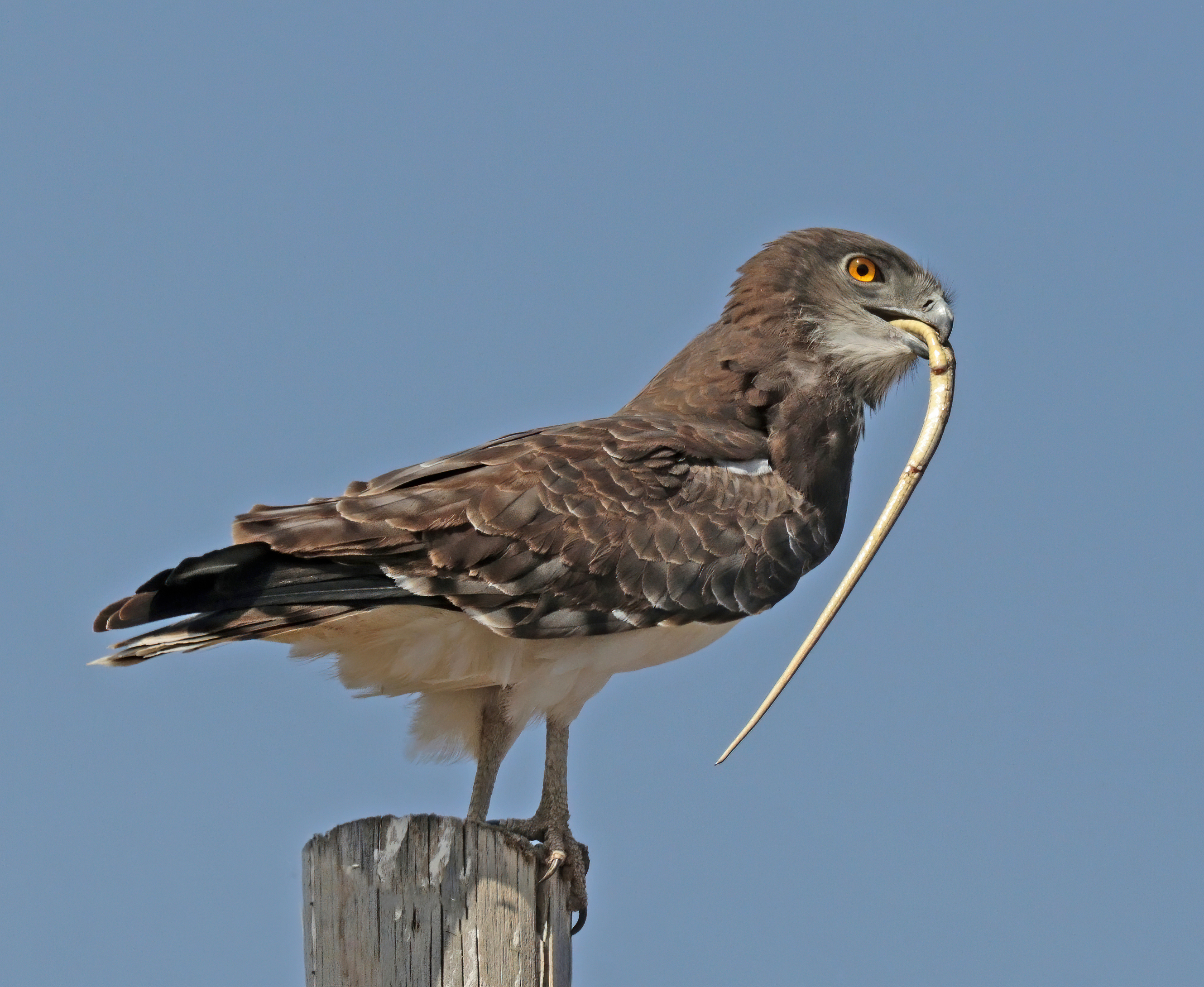
- With a snake Awash National Park, Ethiopia

Conservation status
- Least Concern (IUCN 3.1)

Scientific classification
- Kingdom: Animalia
- Phylum: Chordata
- Class: Aves
- Order: Accipitriformes
- Family: Accipitridae
- Genus: Circaetus
- Species: C. pectoralis

Binomial name
- Circaetus pectoralis A. Smith, 1829

= Black-chested snake eagle =

Species of bird

The black-chested snake eagle or black-breasted snake eagle (Circaetus pectoralis) is a large African bird of prey of the family Accipitridae. It resembles other snake eagles and was formerly considered conspecific with the short-toed and Beaudouin's snake eagles, to which it is closely related.

== Taxonomy ==
Although originally proposed as separate species, many authors previously considered both the black-chested and Beaudouin's snake eagles to be subspecies of the short-toed snake eagle (Circaetus gallicus). However, this convention was not followed by all taxonomists, with some citing differences in adult plumage and breeding ranges as evidence in favour of awarding each full species status. Brown (1974) followed this latter view, but cited several instances of alleged hybridization between the three forms which would justify their treatment as a single species under the Biological Species Concept. However, Clark (1999) suggested that these alleged hybridization events may have instead resulted from misidentification of juvenile or subadult black-chested snake eagles as adults of other species.

A molecular phylogenetic analysis based on two mitochondrial genes and one nuclear intron showed that the Circaetus snake eagles form a monophyletic group that is sister to the Old World vulture group, Aegypiinae. This study also suggested that the black-chested snake eagle was more closely related to the brown snake eagle (Circaetus cinereus) than to the short-toed snake eagle, supporting its taxonomic recognition as a separate species. However, a different molecular phylogenetic study by Wink and Sauer-Gürth (2004) found that the black-chested and short-toed snake eagles form a clade together with the bateleur (Terathopius ecaudatus). The black-chested snake eagle is thus commonly considered to form a superspecies with the short-toed and Beaudouin's snake eagles.

== Identification ==
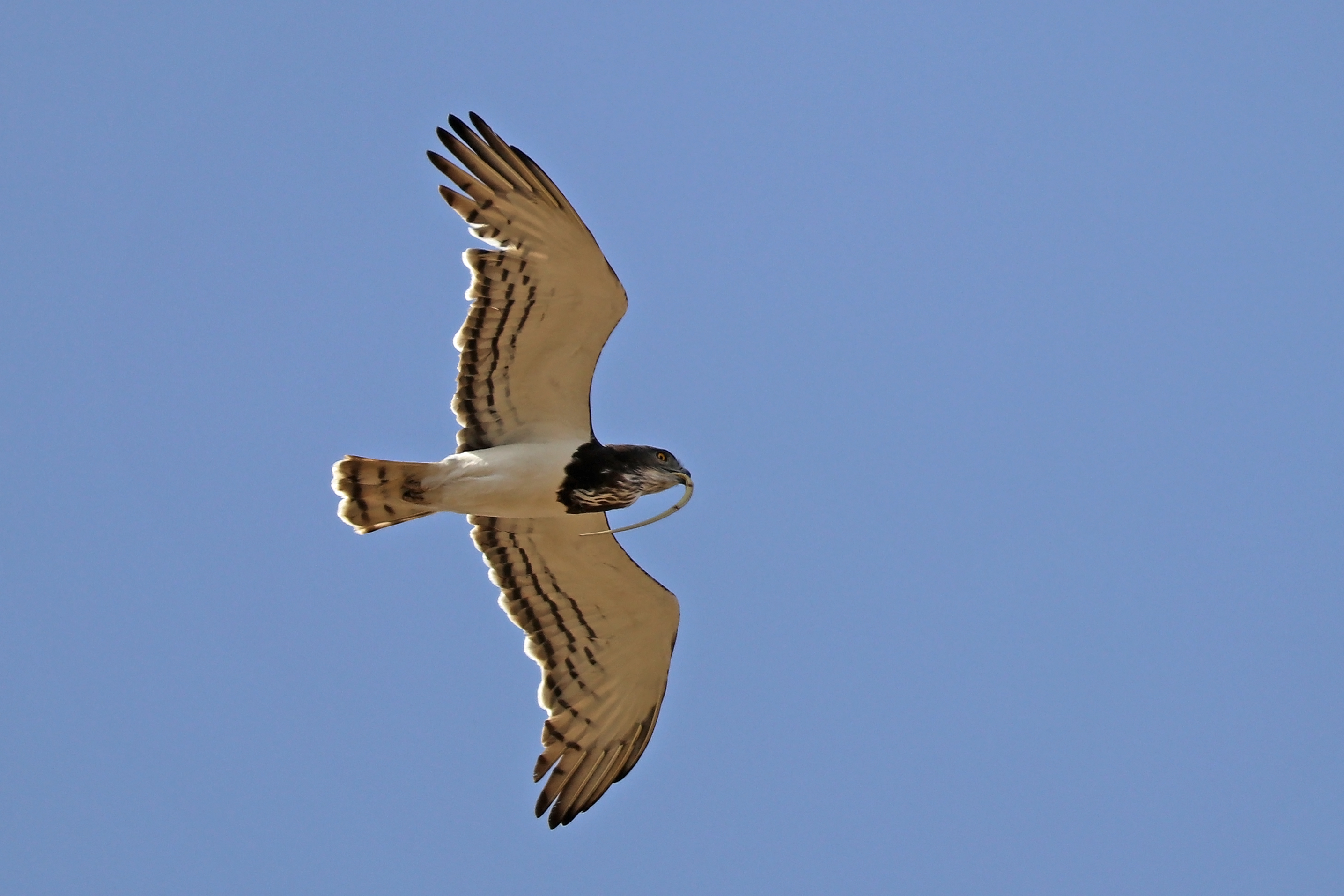
Flying with a snake in its beak, Awash National Park, Ethiopia

The main identifying character of this bird is its dark brown-black head and chest, to which it owes its name. It is distinguished from the short-toed and Beaudouin's snake eagles by its uniform white lower underparts, in contrast to the darkly blotched belly of the short-toed snake eagle and narrowly barred lower underparts of the Beaudouin's. In flight, the dark head and chest contrast with the lower underparts and underwings, which are both white except for three narrow black terminal bars on the underwings. The sexes are alike in plumage, although the female is appreciably larger. In the field the species may also be confused with the martial eagle (Polemaetus bellicosus); however, it is distinguished from this species by its smaller size, unmarked (not spotted) breast, and white (not brown-black) underwings. The eye is bright yellow-orange in colour, the bill horn-coloured and the legs pale grey and unfeathered below the thigh, as in other snake eagles.

The call is a whistled kwo kwo kwo kweeoo.

== Distribution ==
This species has an Afrotropical distribution and can be found throughout southern and East Africa, from Ethiopia and Sudan in the north to South Africa (north of 26S) in the south, ranging as far west as the southern Democratic Republic of the Congo and southeastern Gabon. It is a partial migrant, with many populations in southern Africa and East Africa appearing to be resident year-round, while the species has only ever been recorded as a breeding visitor in Sudan and as a largely non-breeding visitor in Ethiopia and the former Transvaal, where it is considered locally nomadic. However, seasonal movements have been recorded even in areas in which the species is considered resident, for example in Zimbabwe, where there is an influx of birds in the dry winter months.

== Habitat ==
The species inhabits a variety of different habitats, including open acacia and miombo woodlands, grasslands and thornbush savannas, and even semi-arid savanna and desert areas. It avoids mountainous and forested areas. It is usually found singly, although communal roosts of up to 200 birds have been recorded in the non-breeding period. The species is also known to make use of anthropogenic habitats such as farmland and electricity pylons or telephone poles. It is sympatric with the brown snake eagle in much of its range, and the two species have been reported to nest in neighbouring or even the same pylon without apparent animosity.

== Feeding Ecology ==
As its name indicates, this bird feeds mostly on snakes (particularly venomous snakes up to 80 cm. in length), but will also prey on lizards, insects, small mammals and frogs. It mainly hunts from a perch or by hovering or searching the ground, stalking prey on the wing and then parachuting slowly to the ground to capture its prey. The species has also been found to be highly dependent on seasonal fluctuations in small mammal prey availability, with its numbers increasing in accordance with booms in small mammal abundance in the Serengeti National Park. A specimen collected from Morogoro in 1922 was found to have a pellet of rodent fur and a hissing sand snake in its stomach contents.

== Reproduction ==
The black-chested snake eagle nests in trees (typically in the crown of flat-topped acacia, although there is one record of the species nesting in the pine Pinus patula), and typically builds its nests concealed in mistletoe or epiphytic vegetation. The nest itself is a small stick structure. The female will lay only one egg per clutch, which is white and unmarked in appearance. The egg is incubated for 52 days, with the female performing the incubating alone while the male provides her with food. After hatching, the chick remains in the nest for approximately 3 months (90 days). Breeding occurs year-round, although it peaks during the dry winter months in South Africa; in the Kgalagadi Transfrontier Park, the peak time of egg laying has been reported to be between June–July, whereas eggs are laid slightly later in the former Transvaal, around July–August. In Zimbabwe and Zambia, nests containing eggs have been found from February to December, with a peak around April–July (in Zambia) and July–September (in Zimbabwe).

== Conservation ==
The species is categorized as Least Concern by the IUCN and BirdLife International. Although widespread, its status varies from uncommon to locally common, and its numbers fluctuate even in areas in which it is believed to be resident. For example, in the Kgalagadi Transfrontier Park it has been reported to be very abundant in certain years, but very scarce to virtually absent from the area in others. Brown (1982) suggested that these apparent fluctuations in population size may be the result of range overlap between resident and migratory or nomadic populations, although seasonal fluctuations in prey availability may also play a role. Anthropogenic causes of death in the species include the common threats of drowning, shooting, electrocution and collision with power lines. Recovery of seven out of 289 birds ringed between 1948 and 1998 suggested that drowning in sheer-walled water reservoirs was the most common cause of death (2 birds), followed by shooting and electrocution or collision with power lines (1 bird each). However, anthropogenic mortality appears to be low in this species, with only one black-chested snake eagle found drowned in a water reservoir in the Kgalagadi Transfrontier Park between 1988 and 1994, while five of the seven ringed birds recovered between 1948 and 1998 survived for periods ranging from 3.5 years to 13 years after ringing.
