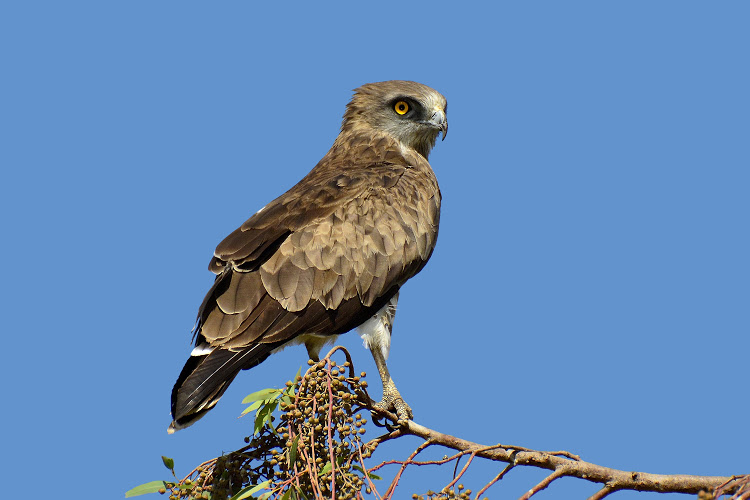
- Short-toed snake eagle (Circaetus gallicus)

Scientific classification
- Kingdom: Animalia
- Phylum: Chordata
- Class: Aves
- Order: Accipitriformes
- Family: Accipitridae
- Subfamily: Circaetinae
- Genus: Circaetus; Vieillot, 1816

Type species
- Falco gallicus Gmelin, 1788

= Circaetus =

Genus of birds

Circaetus, the snake eagles, is a genus of medium-sized eagles in the bird of prey family Accipitridae. They are mainly resident African species, but the migratory short-toed snake eagle breeds from the Mediterranean basin into Russia, the Middle East and India, and winters in sub-Saharan Africa and east to Indonesia.

Snake eagles are found in open habitats like cultivated plains and arid savanna, but require trees in which to build a stick nest. The single egg is incubated mainly or entirely by the female.

Circaetus eagles have a rounded head and broad wings. They prey on reptiles, mainly snakes (hence the common name), but also take lizards and occasionally small mammals.

== Taxonomy and species ==
The genus Circaetus was introduced in 1816 by the French ornithologist Louis Pierre Vieillot to accommodate a single species, the short-toed snake eagle, which is therefore considered the type species. The genus name is from the Ancient Greek kirkos, a type of hawk, and aetos, "eagle".

The genus contains seven species.

Image	Common name	Scientific name	Distribution
	Western banded snake eagle	Circaetus cinerascens	Senegal and Gambia to west Ethiopia and south to Namibia and Zimbabwe
	Southern banded snake eagle	Circaetus fasciolatus	Kenya to northeast South Africa
	Congo serpent eagle	Circaetus spectabilis	West and central Africa
	Beaudouin's snake eagle	Circaetus beaudouini	Senegal to South Sudan, northwest Kenya and Uganda
	Black-chested snake eagle	Circaetus pectoralis	east Sudan and Ethiopia to South Africa
	Short-toed snake eagle	Circaetus gallicus	southwest Europe to central Asia, northwest China and India; Lesser Sunda Islands
	Brown snake eagle	Circaetus cinereus	Senegal and Gambia to Ethiopia and south to South Africa

== Fossil record ==
Circaetus rhodopensis (late Miocene of Bulgaria)

Circaetus haemusensis (early Pleistocene of Bulgaria)
