= Munzur Mountains =

Mountain range in northeastern Turkey

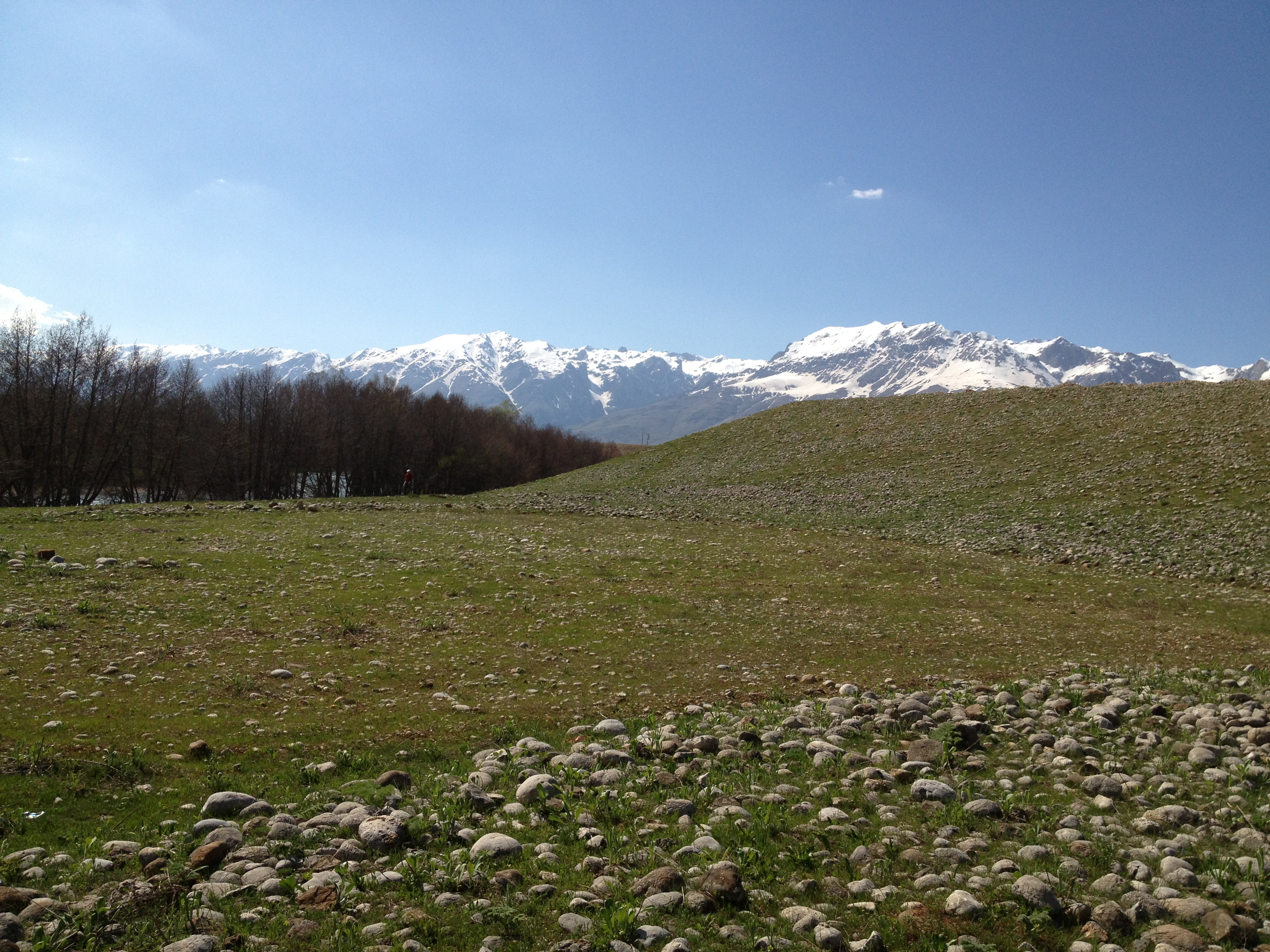
- Munzur Mountains from Ovacık

Highest point
- Elevation: 3,300 m (10,800 ft)
- Coordinates: 39°26′42″N 39°02′02″E

Geography
- Location within Turkey
- Location: Tunceli Province, Erzincan Province, Bingöl Province, Turkey

Munzur Mountains (Turkish: Munzur Dağları), also known as the Mercan Mountain Range (Turkish: Mercan sıradağları), is a mountain range in Eastern Anatolia region, Turkey. It is located on the border of Tunceli and Erzincan provinces. There is Munzur Valley National Park in the Munzur Mountains.

== Geology and geomorphology ==
Munzur Mountains covers the south of Erzincan and the north of Tunceli and ends on the Bingöl Provincial border. The steep walls that do not give passages other than the valleys opened by the streams continue until the peaks of the area. Lake Karagöl is one of the main lakes in the Munzur Mountains. Others are Lake Çinili and Lake Baraların.
