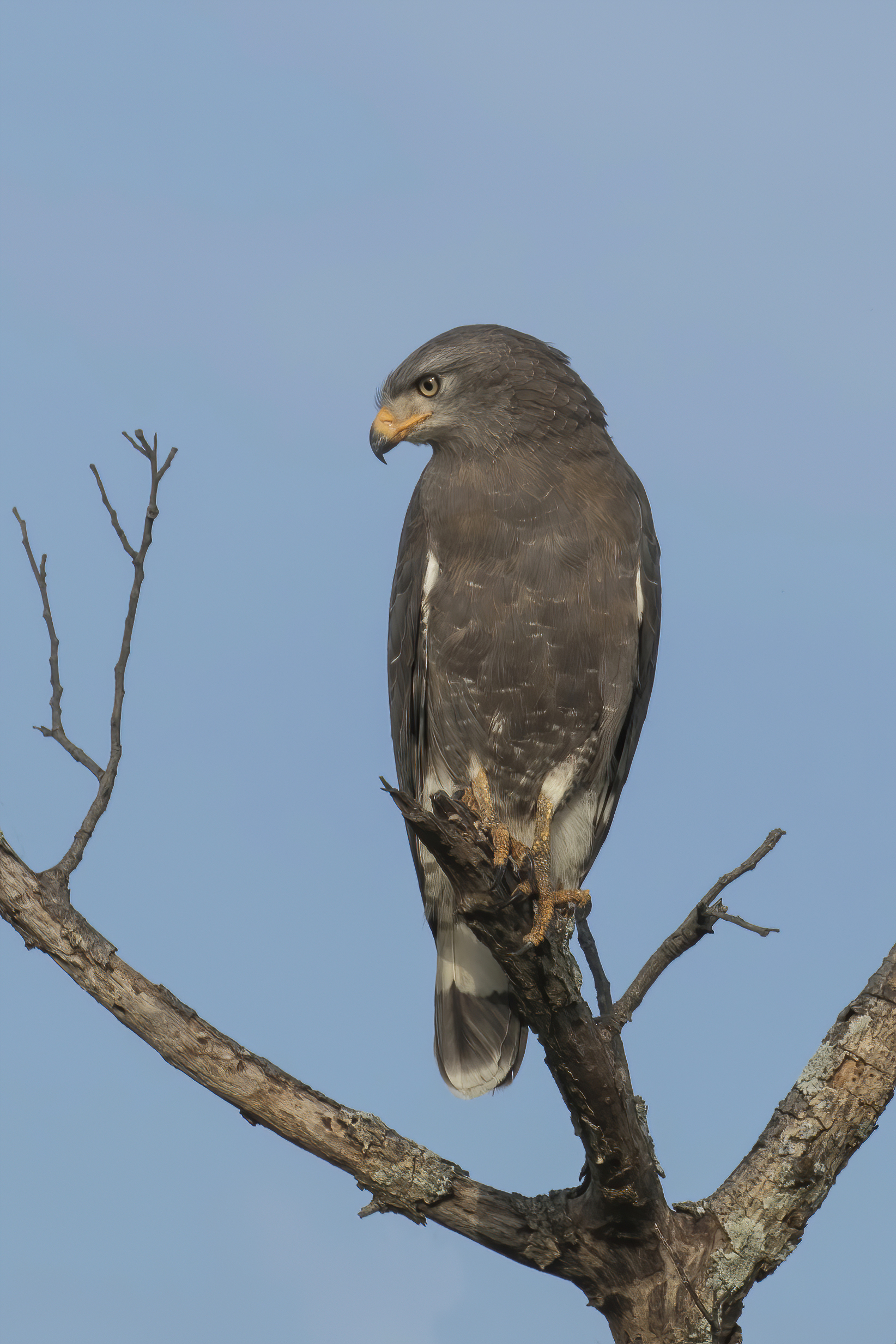
- Matetsi Safari Area, Zimbabwe
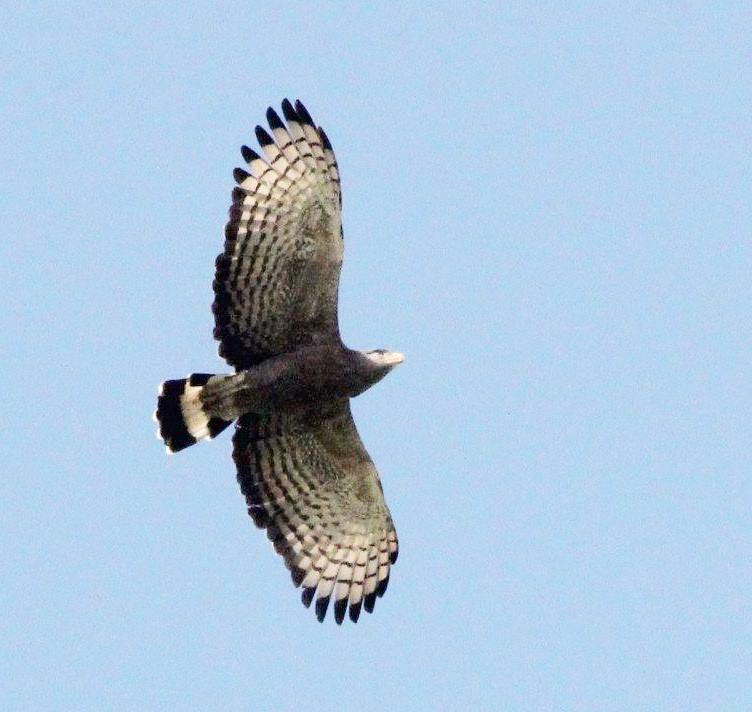

Conservation status
- Least Concern (IUCN 3.1)

Scientific classification
- Kingdom: Animalia
- Phylum: Chordata
- Class: Aves
- Order: Accipitriformes
- Family: Accipitridae
- Genus: Circaetus
- Species: C. cinerascens

Binomial name
- Circaetus cinerascens von Müller, 1851

= Western banded snake eagle =

Species of raptor

The western banded snake eagle (Circaetus cinerascens) is a grey-brown African raptor with a short tail and a large head. Juveniles have paler and browner upper parts than adults, with white-edged feathers. The eagle's head, neck and breast are dark-streaked. The underparts are white with pale brown streaks, mainly on belly and thighs. Subadults may be all dark grey-brown without any streak on underparts. The eyes, ears, and legs are yellow. They have crested chests.

== Description ==
It has a total length of 50-58 cm (19 to 22 in) and a wingspan of 120-134 cm (3 ft 11 in to 4 ft 4 in)

== Habitat ==
Western banded snake eagles live in woodlands, mainly along rivers, but they avoid dense forests.

== Behaviour ==
Western banded snake eagles mainly hunt snakes, but also other small vertebrates, ambushing from a perch. They drop from the perch to trunk, foliage or ground. They are solitary birds, and very secretive. Due to their sedentary lifestyle, they are often detected only by their calls.

The western banded snake eagle sometimes rises to soar, while it calls above the canon. They utter a loud, high-pitched 'kok-kok-kok-kok-kok'.

== Geographic range ==
They are found in Africa in the northern tropics from Senegal and Gambia east through to Ethiopia and then south to southern Angola and Zimbabwe, mostly west of the Rift Valley, but are mostly absent from the western lowland equatorial forests. They inhabit woodland and forest edges. This is an uncommon bird which is often difficult to spot. Its distribution is patchy and it is vulnerable to loss of its riverine habitat. It feeds primarily on reptiles and amphibians which it captures either on the ground or in trees.

== Reproduction ==
The western banded snake eagle nests among creepers and foliage, making a new nest every year. It builds a small stick-nest, well concealed within vegetation. The female lays only one egg. Incubation may last between 35 and 55 days, mainly by the female. The young fledge from the nest after 10 to 15 weeks.
