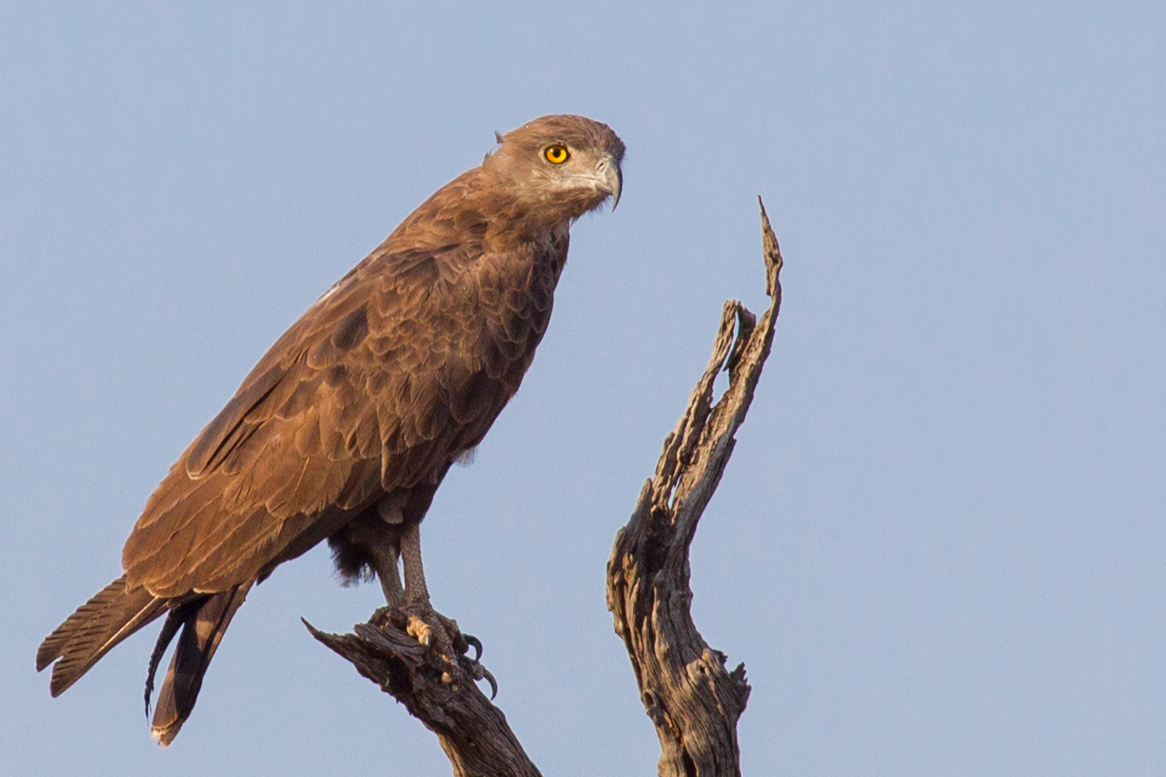
- Adult in Madikwe GR, South Africa

Conservation status
- Least Concern (IUCN 3.1)

Scientific classification
- Kingdom: Animalia
- Phylum: Chordata
- Class: Aves
- Order: Accipitriformes
- Family: Accipitridae
- Genus: Circaetus
- Species: C. cinereus

Binomial name
- Circaetus cinereus Vieillot, 1818

= Brown snake eagle =

Species of bird

The brown snake eagle (Circaetus cinereus) is a fairly large species of bird of prey in the family Accipitridae. It is found in West, East and southern Africa. This species is an almost obligate predator of a variety of snakes. A very solitary bird, the brown snake eagle has a prolonged breeding cycle and raises a single eaglet. Although probably naturally scarce, it is classified as a least concern species as it continues to occur over a very broad range.

== Distribution and habitat ==
This species is distributed widely in Africa. In west Africa, ranges from southeastern Mauritania, Senegal, The Gambia, Guinea-Bissau, eastern and western Guinea, Sierra Leone, the northern, inland parts of Liberia, Ivory Coast, Ghana, Togo, Benin, Nigeria as well as inland in Mali and Niger. From there they range across to southern Chad, southern Sudan, South Sudan, inland in Eritrea and northern Ethiopia and central Ethiopia and in southern Somalia through much of Kenya, Uganda and the southern part of the Democratic Republic of the Congo down through southern Africa to about half of Namibia, all of Botswana and Zimbabwe and northeastern and eastern South Africa. Although it is not migratory, brown snake eagles may be somewhat nomadic, with cases of birds on territories stretching up to 200 km (120 mi) apart. Furthermore, ringed birds have been known to travel 2,100 km (1,300 mi) away (from South Africa to the Democratic Republic of the Congo). This species dwell in open woods and wooded savanna, most often preferring areas where gulley or wooded hillocks break up flat areas, apparently preferring somewhat more densely wooded areas than related snake eagles. This species may dwell at any elevation from sea level to 2,000 m (6,600 ft) high.

== Description ==
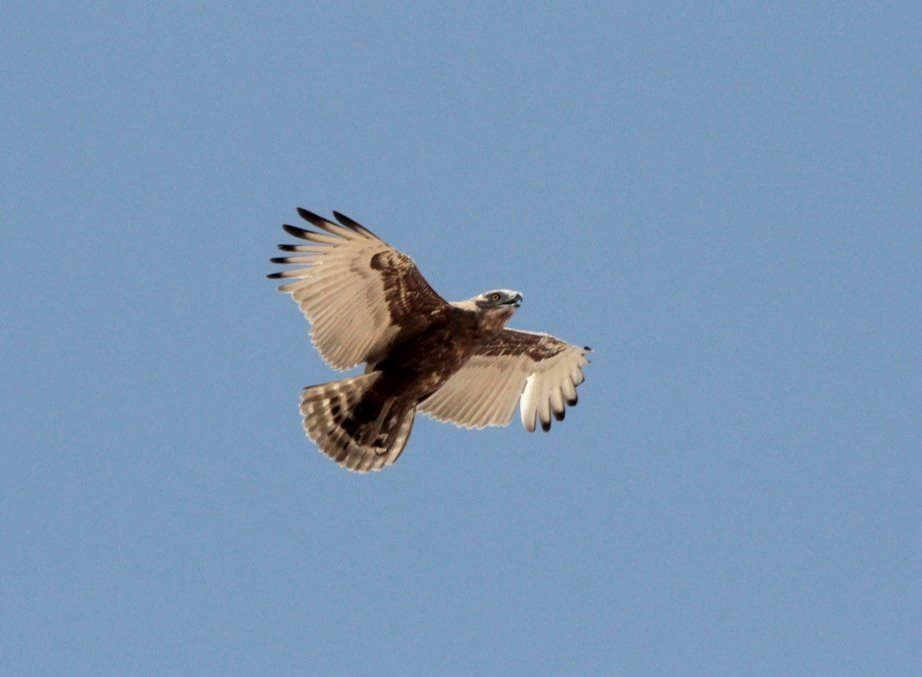
Adult soaring over Kang in central Botswana

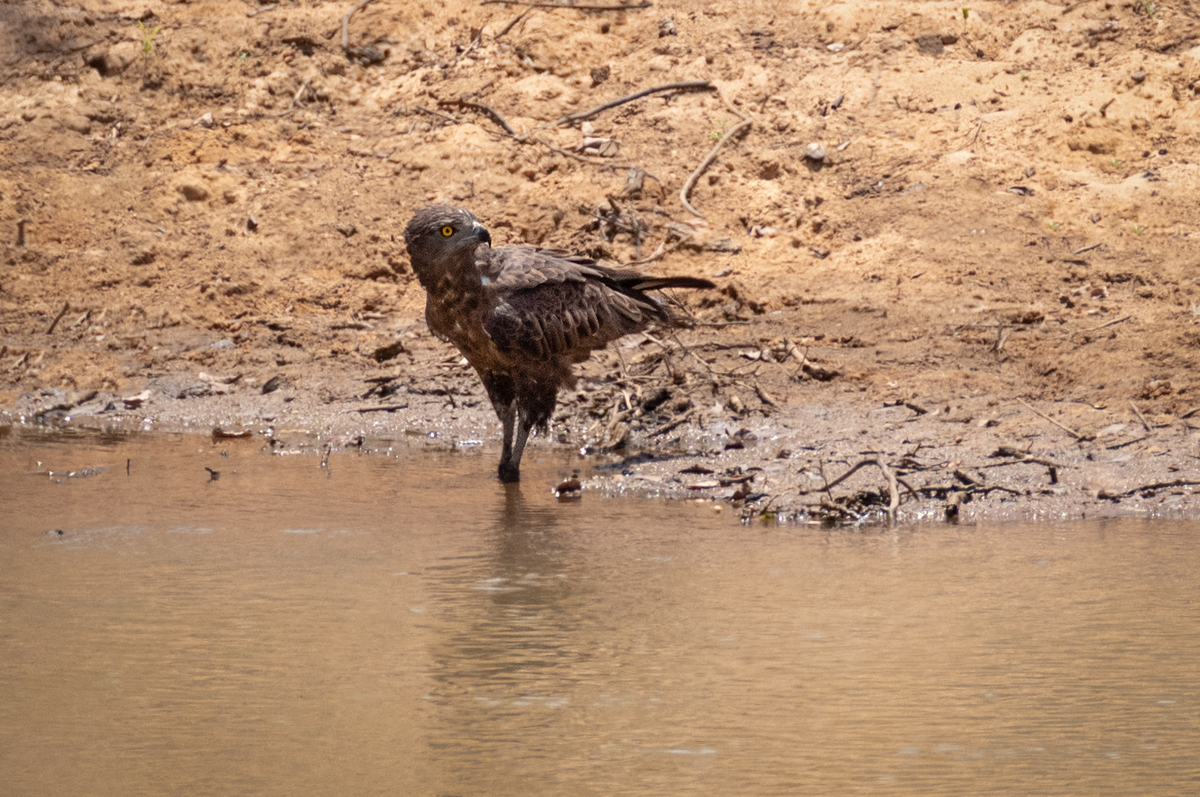
Brown snake eagle hydrating after a drink in Yankari National Park, Bauchi, Nigeria

Their plumage about the body is entirely a fairly dark, hazel brown, with some claims of a purplish sheen in certain light conditions. The body colour extends to the wings but for their contrasting unmarked flight feathers which are whitish-grey. The shortish tail, which is most easily seen in flight, is at all ages barred brown and grayish cream. The juvenile is similar in appearance and colour but tends to have very sparse white feather bases, with birds from south of the range apparently showing heavier white speckling, especially on the abdomen and head. This species has a large head and bare legs, which serve to distinguish it from other brownish medium-sized eagles in Africa, although a juvenile bateleur could be confused with one in poor light, but its colour is more varying, its eyes brown and the species has a shorter tail and shorter legs. The brown snake eagle is of medium size relative to species referred to as eagles, however it is the largest member of the Circaetus genus. Of the living species in the Circaetinae subfamily, it is similar in size to the bateleur but much smaller than the Philippine eagle. Total length is from 66 to 78 cm (26 to 31 in) and wingspan is from 160 to 185 cm (5 ft 3 in to 6 ft 1 in), though wingspans of up to 200 cm (6 ft 7 in) may possibly be attained. Known weights are between 1.5 and 2.5 kg (3.3 and 5.5 lb), with an average of around 2.05 kg (4.5 lb). Despite its fairly large size, this species has a relative small wing spread, being smaller winged than the bateleur and even the much lighter black-breasted snake eagle. The brown snake eagle's call is a hoarse, guttural hok-hok-hok-hok, usually uttered in territorial displays at conspecifics and sometimes culminating in a crowing kaaww. Pairs also call a soft kwee-oo probably as a contact call at the nest.

== Biology ==
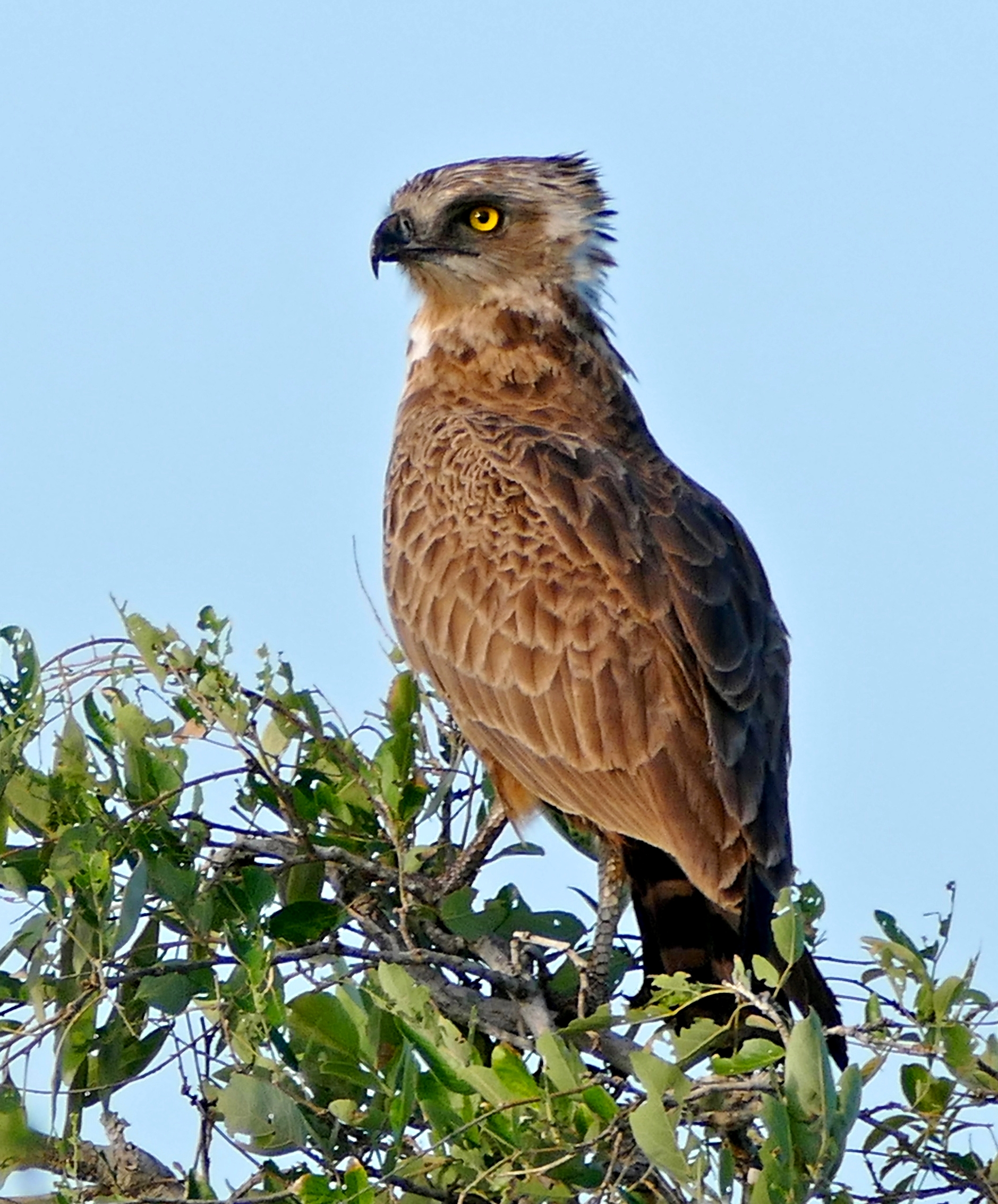
Immature in Kruger NP, South Africa

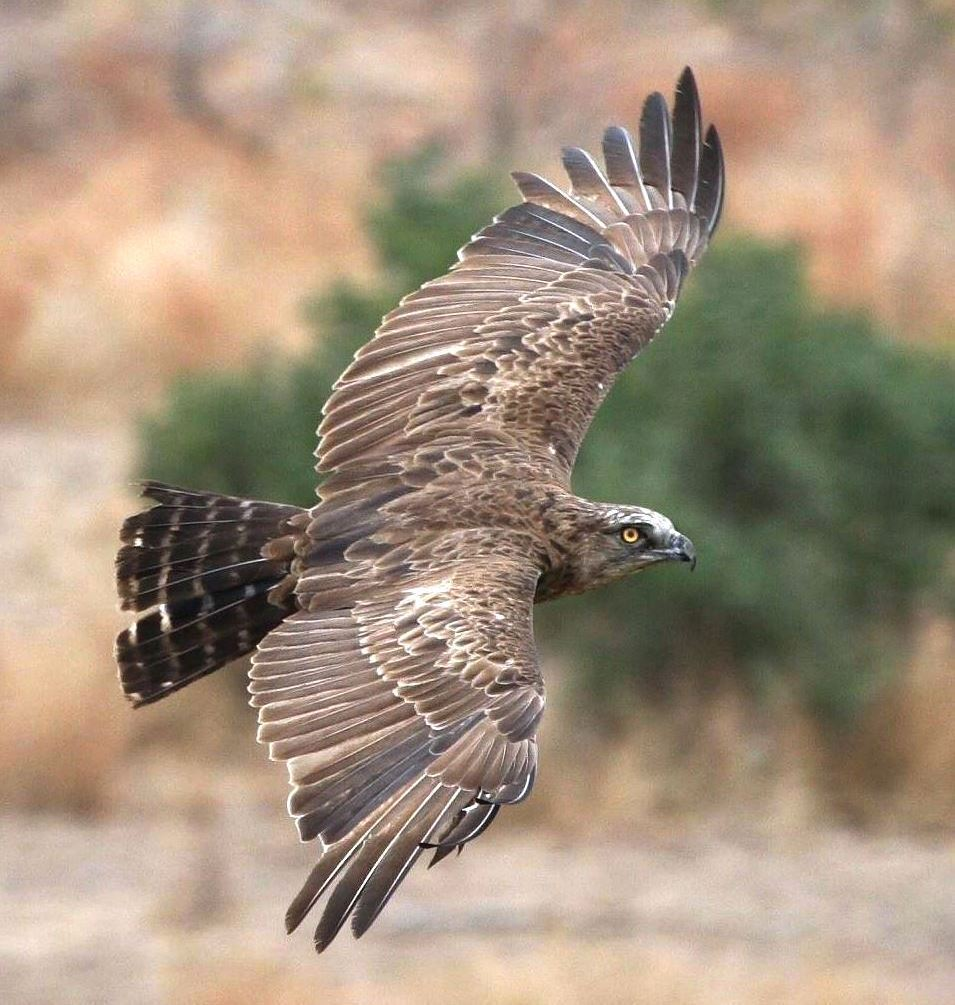
Subadult in flight, Kruger NP

The brown snake eagle is somewhat larger and more powerful than other snake eagles and consequently tends to take relatively larger prey. It seems virtually any reasonably sized snake, regardless of whether harmless or venomous is taken more or less indiscriminately. Like others in their subfamily, they have natural protection against bites, with thick-skinned legs. 3 out of 4 identified snake species recorded at a nest in Zimbabwe were venomous species, including boomslang, puff adder and black-necked spitting cobra. Most snakes taken here were decapitated before being brought to the nest. Large adult snakes were taken here, including a large puff adder weighing about 750 g (1.65 lb). Even more impressive accounts are known of this species hunting adult black mambas, including specimens measuring up to at least 2.8 m (9 ft 2 in). Hunting is typically from a tree perch or hillock, but also rarely sometimes from flight, and taken almost exclusively on the ground. Like most snake eagles, they quite often swallow their prey whole (though particularly large snakes are torn apart), but seldom do so in flight as do other snake eagles. Alternate prey is known to have included monitor lizards, toads, francolins, guineafowl and chickens as well as rats and perhaps other mammals.

This species is solitary and even the breeding pair is rarely seen in the same place at any point of the year. Males do almost all known territorial display flights, which sometimes escalate from typical soaring into butterfly-like erratic flight movements and, if escalated, into interlocking of talons and cartwheeling. Breeding takes places in November to July in northern part of range and, although potentially in nearly any month, mainly December-July in Zimbabwe and February-October in Kenya. The nests are relatively small, usually about 60 to 70 cm (24 to 28 in) across and 15 to 30 cm (5.9 to 11.8 in) deep, often being on flat-topped trees such as Acacia or Euphorbia at 3.5 to 11 m (11 to 36 ft) above the ground. Sometimes the nests are infrequently on top of epiphytes, buffalo-weaver nests or on electric pylons. Old nests of other raptors are not infrequently used, from tawny eagle to gymnogene nests, and are frequently perceptibly bulkier than those built by snake eagles themselves. A single egg clutch is laid and is incubated mainly by the female for approximately 50 days (quite long for an eagle of this size). Like most birds of prey, the female largely takes on brooding and the male food deliveries. In this species, the male often arrives with a snake hanging from his mouth with only the tail extending from his throat, the female then pulls it out of his bill and throat, thereafter she tears the prey into appropriately sized bites for the single eaglet. The juvenile eagles stay around the nest for 60–100 days before exploring branches along the perimeter, until they fledge at 97-113 (mean of about 109) days. The juvenile brown snake eagle is completely independent a few weeks after fledging. Though the young eagle may continue to beg the adults, the parents soon lose interest in feeding the young eagle. Typical lifespan in this species is around 7–10 years, fairly short for an eagle. This species is somewhat scarce and is possibly declining overall per the IUCN but it is persisting fairly strongly over a large range, that includes 23.3 thousand square kilometers. It is therefore at least concern status for immediate conservation attention.
