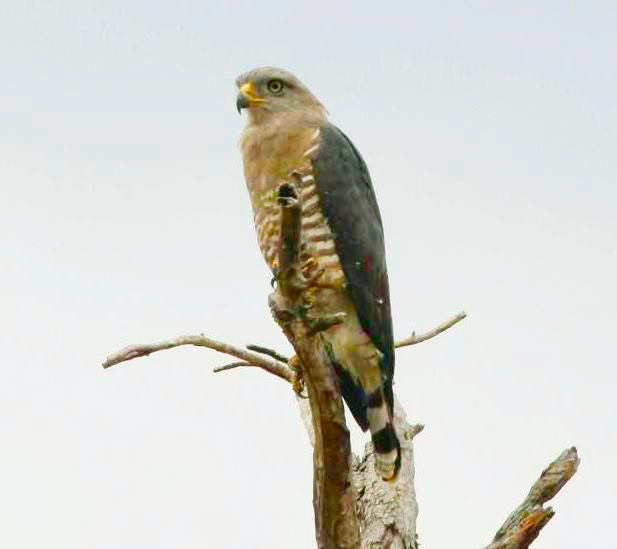
- Individual in Sofala, Mozambique

Conservation status
- Near Threatened (IUCN 3.1)

Scientific classification
- Kingdom: Animalia
- Phylum: Chordata
- Class: Aves
- Order: Accipitriformes
- Family: Accipitridae
- Genus: Circaetus
- Species: C. fasciolatus

Binomial name
- Circaetus fasciolatus Kaup, 1847

= Southern banded snake eagle =

Species of bird

The southern banded snake eagle (Circaetus fasciolatus), also known as the East African snake eagle or fasciated snake eagle, is a species of snake eagle in the family Accipitridae which is found in eastern Sub-Saharan Africa.

== Description ==
The southern banded snake eagle is a rather small, stocky snake eagle with a large, rounded head which has a hooded beak. It has a grey-brown head contrasting slightly with the mainly blackish-brown upperparts and whitish underparts. The tail has a white tip and shows three distinct dark bands on the underside. The large eyes are pale yellow eyes, the feet and cere are yellow and the bill us black. The juvenile lacks the grey head, has mainly dark upperparts and the whitish pale underparts are marked with dark streaks on the face, throat and upper breast. The total length varies from 55 to 60 cm with females larger than males.

=== Voice ===
The southern banded snake eagle is unobtrusive and is normally found due to its noisy, high-pitched call, "ko-ko-ko-kaw", repeatedly made either from a perch or while in flight.

== Distribution ==
The southern banded snake eagle occurs in a narrow band along the east African coast from southern Somalia to the north eastern Kwazulu-Natal and inland along the Save River into south eastern Zimbabwe.

== Habitat ==
The southern banded snake eagle is a forest species and it mainly occurs in evergreen coastal forest but also in dense inland forests close to wetlands, it is occasionally recorded from more open areas of woodland.

== Biology ==
As its name suggests, the southern banded snake eagle mainly eats snakes, hunting from a perch, scanning the surroundings for prey. If a large snake is caught, it is torn up into bite-size pieces before feeding; however, smaller snakes are swallowed whole, head-first. It has also been recorded feeding on lizards, frogs and termite alates.

The nest is constructed by both sexes and is an open platform of small sticks roughly 50–70 cm wide with an inner cup which is 17 cm across and is lined with fresh foliage. The nest is normally placed in the main fork of a tree. The single egg is laid from August–October and is mainly incubated by the female for about 50 days, although the male may take over for short stints early on in the incubation period. Both parents feed the young on a diet of ripped up snakes. At first the male does the majority of the hunting, while the female looks after the nestling.
