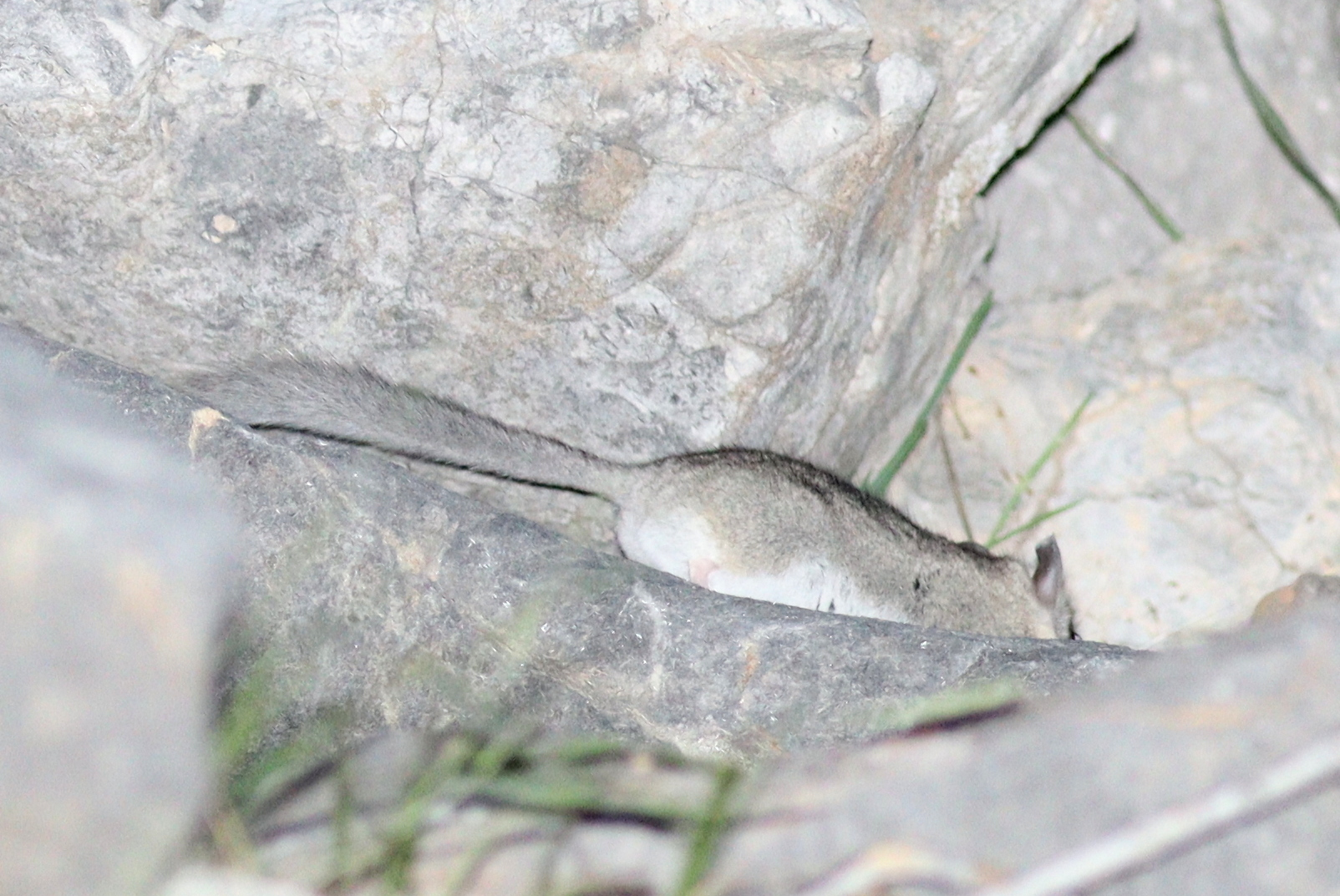

Conservation status
- Data Deficient (IUCN 3.1)

Scientific classification
- Kingdom: Animalia
- Phylum: Chordata
- Class: Mammalia
- Order: Rodentia
- Family: Gliridae
- Genus: Dryomys
- Species: D. laniger

Binomial name
- Dryomys laniger Felten & Storch, 1968

= Woolly dormouse =

Species of rodent

The woolly dormouse (Dryomys laniger) is a species of rodent in the family Gliridae endemic to Turkey.

== Distribution and habitat ==
The woolly dormouse's range is restricted to south-west to eastern Anatolia along the Taurus Mountains. It lives in rocky and stony alpine sites. In its south-western range, it is found in rocky areas surrounded by cedar, juniper, cypress, fir and oak trees.

== Diet ==
It is an omnivore, eating arthropods such as beetles and grasshoppers as well as some vegetable matter.
