= Lake Karagöl =

Lake in Turkey

- Location within Turkey
- Location: Ovacık, Tunceli Province
- Coordinates: 39.42432°N 39.11236°E
- Lake type: Freshwater, Glacial lake
- Basin countries: Turkey
- Average depth: 60 m (200 ft)
- Surface elevation: 2,500 m (8,200 ft)

Lake Karagöl (Turkish: Karagöl Gölü); is a Glacial lake on the Munzur Mountains in the Ovacık district of Tunceli province, Turkey. It is one of the largest lakes in Tunceli.

== Geology and geography ==
Karagöl Lake is fed by the resources in the mountains. The lake level reaches its highest level in May and June.
