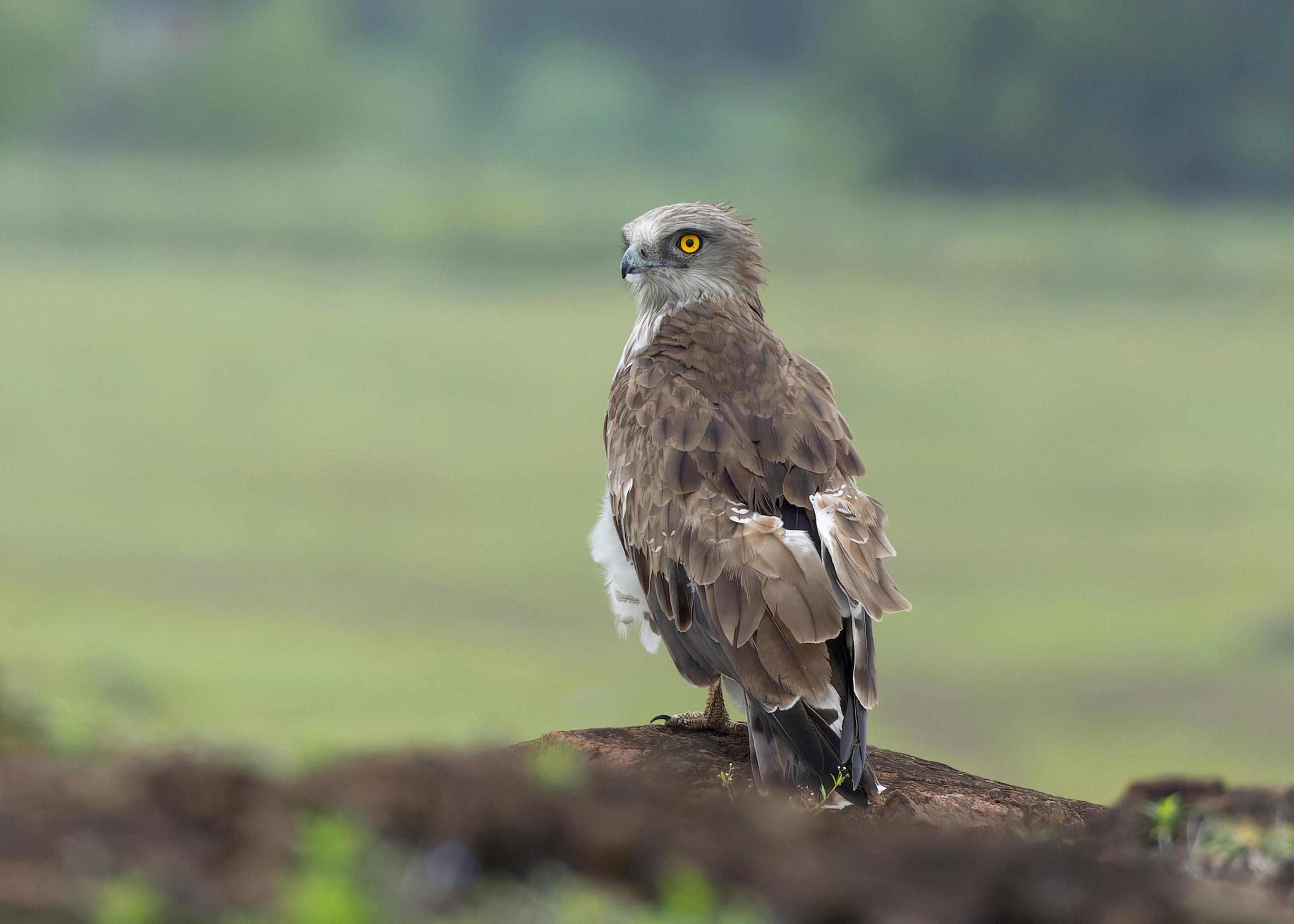
- Short-toed snake eagle (Circaetus gallicus) in Bhigwan, Maharashtra, India.

Conservation status
- Least Concern (IUCN 3.1)

Scientific classification
- Kingdom: Animalia
- Phylum: Chordata
- Class: Aves
- Order: Accipitriformes
- Family: Accipitridae
- Genus: Circaetus
- Species: C. gallicus

Binomial name
- Circaetus gallicus (Gmelin, JF, 1788)

Subspecies
- C. g. gallicus - (Gmelin, JF, 1788); C. g. sacerdotis - Ng, N, Christidis, Olsen, Norman & Rheindt, 2017
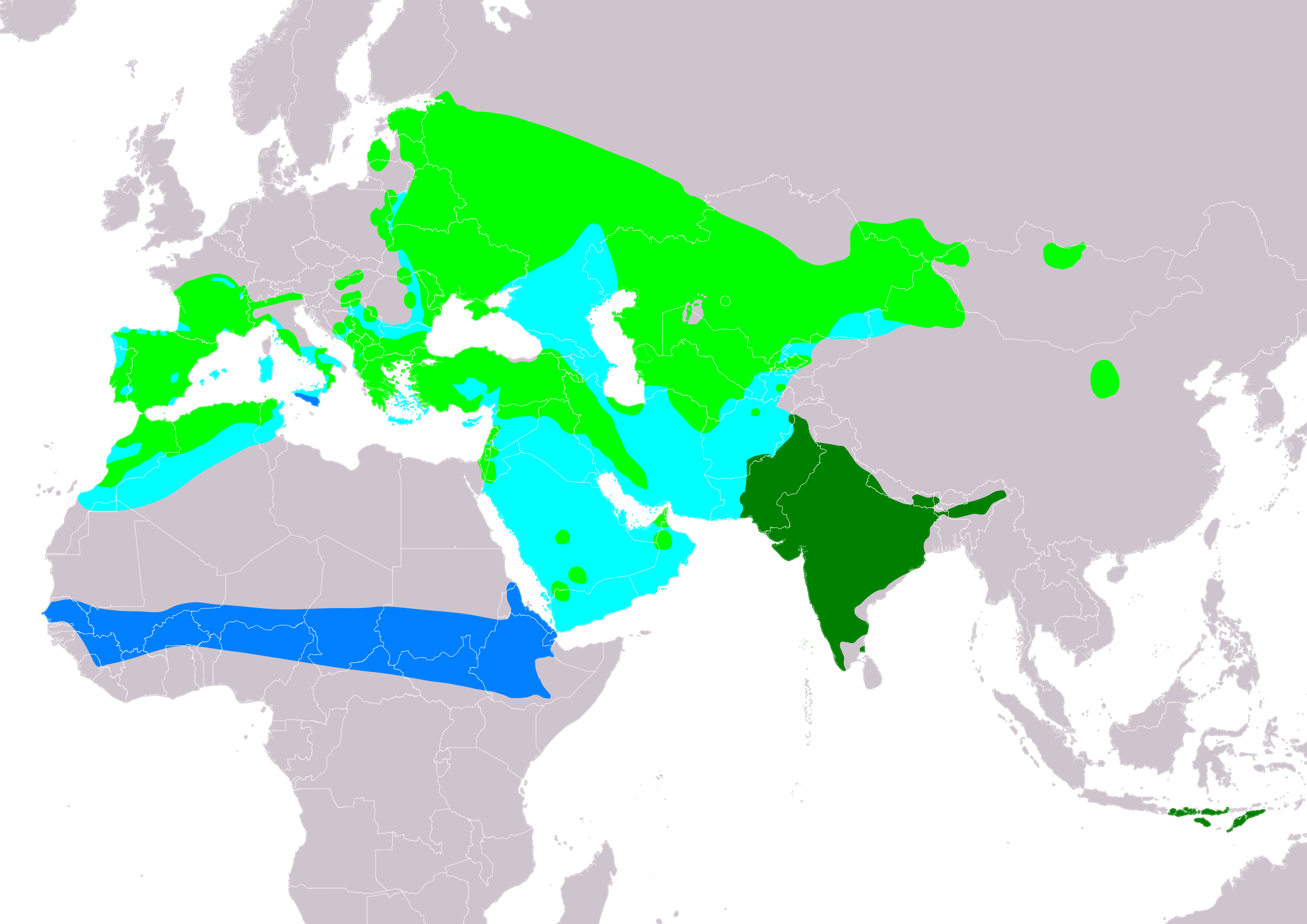
- Range of C. gallicus Breeding Resident Passage Non-breeding

= Short-toed snake eagle =

Species of bird

The short-toed snake eagle (Circaetus gallicus), also known as the short-toed eagle, is a medium-sized bird of prey in the family Accipitridae, which also includes many other diurnal raptors such as kites, buzzards and harriers. The genus name Circaetus is from the Ancient Greek kirkos, a type of hawk, and aetos, "eagle". The specific gallicus means "of Gallia".

== Taxonomy ==
The short-toed snake eagle was formally described in 1788 by the German naturalist Johann Friedrich Gmelin in his revised and expanded edition of Carl Linnaeus's Systema Naturae. He placed it with the falcons, eagles and their relatives in the genus Falco and coined the binomial name Falco gallicus. Gmelin based his description on the "Jean le Blanc" that had been described by the English ornithologist John Latham and the French ornithologists Mathurin Jacques Brisson and the Comte de Buffon. The short-toed snake eagle is now placed in the genus Circaetus that was introduced in 1816 by the French ornithologist Louis Pierre Vieillot. The genus name is from the Ancient Greek kirkos, a type of hawk, and aetos, "eagle". The specific epithet gallicus is Latin for "Gaul" ie France.

Two subspecies are recognised:

- C. g. gallicus (Gmelin, JF, 1788) – southwest Europe to central Asia, northwest China and India
- C. g. sacerdotis Ng, NSR, Christidis, Olsen, Norman & Rheindt, 2017 – east Java, Bali, and Lombok to Timor (Lesser Sunda Islands)

== Description ==
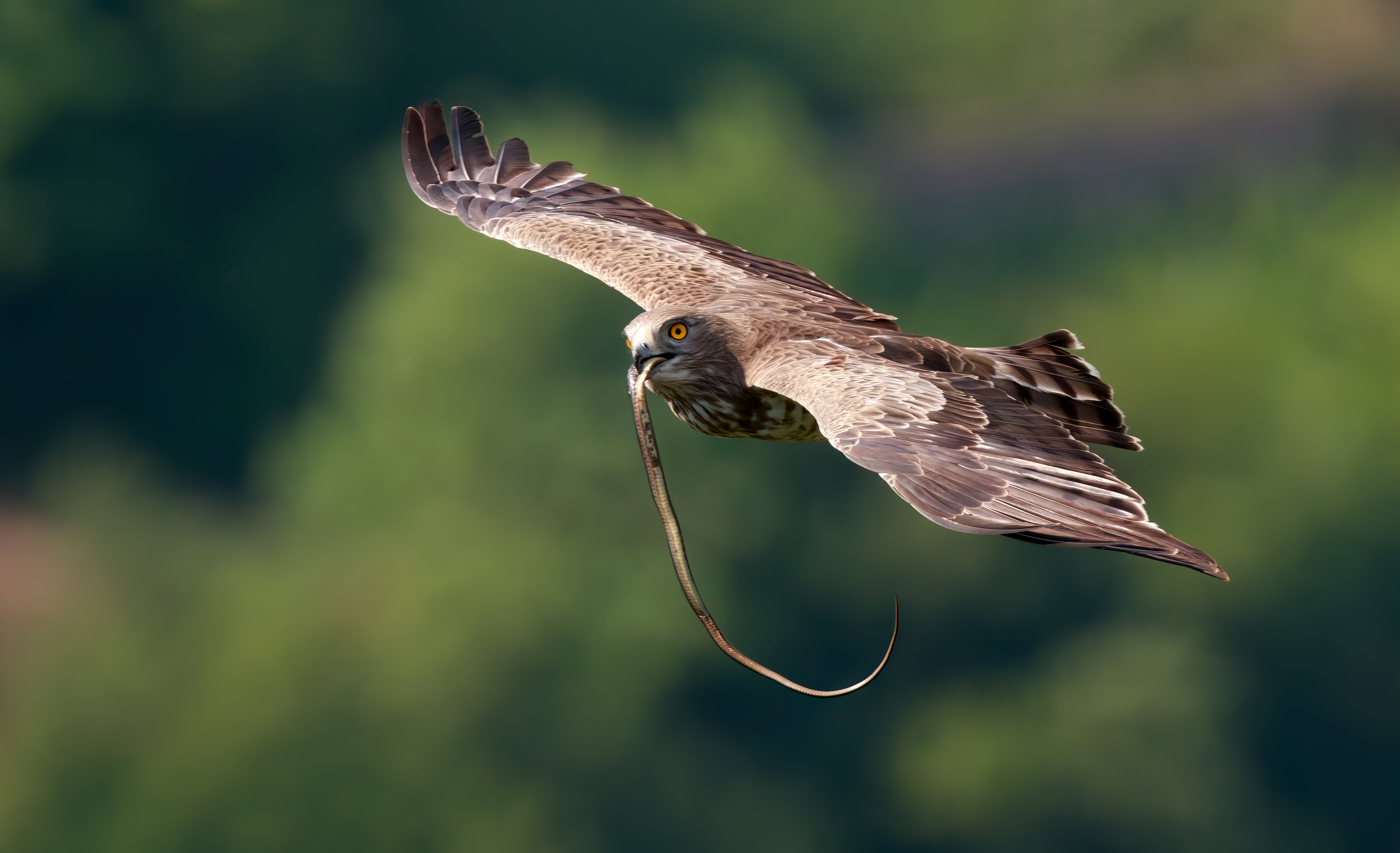
The short-toed snake eagle gets its vernacular name from its snake-rich diet.

These are relatively large snake eagles. Adults are 59 to 70 cm (23 to 28 in) long with a 162 to 195 cm (5 ft 4 in to 6 ft 5 in) wingspan and weigh 1.2–2.3 kg (2.6–5.1 lb), an average weight for the species is about 1.7 kg (3.7 lb). They can be recognised in the field by their predominantly white underside, the upper parts being greyish brown. The chin, throat and upper breast are a pale, earthy brown. The tail has 3 or 4 bars. Additional indications are an owl-like rounded head, brightly yellow eyes and lightly barred under wing.

The short-toed snake eagle spends more time on the wing than do most members of its genus. It favours soaring over hill slopes and hilltops on updraughts, and it does much of its hunting from this position at heights of up to 500 m (1,600 ft). When quartering open country it frequently hovers like a kestrel. When it soars it does so on flattish wings.

== Distribution and habitat ==
This is an Old World species found throughout the Mediterranean basin, into Russia and the Middle East, and parts of Western Asia, and in the Indian subcontinent and also further east in some Indonesian islands.

Those present on the northern edge of the Mediterranean and other parts of Europe migrate mainly to sub-Saharan Africa north of the equator, leaving in September/October and returning in April/May. In the Middle and Far East the populations are resident. In Europe, it is most numerous in Spain where it is fairly common but elsewhere it is rare in many parts of its range. A bird on the Isles of Scilly, Britain, in October 1999 was the first confirmed record for that country.

The short-toed snake eagle is found in open cultivated plains, arid stony deciduous scrub areas and foothills and semi-desert areas. It requires trees for nesting and open habitats, such as cultivations and grasslands for foraging.

== Behaviour ==
Its prey is mostly reptiles, mainly snakes, but also some lizards. Sometimes they become entangled with larger snakes and battle on the ground. Occasionally, they prey on small mammals up to the size of a rabbit, and rarely birds and large insects.

This eagle is generally very silent. On occasions, it emits a variety of musical whistling notes. When breeding, it lays only one egg. It can live up to 17 years.

The short-toed snake eagle has suffered a steep decline in numbers and range in Europe and is now rare and still decreasing in several countries due to changes in agriculture and land use. It needs protection. In the middle and far eastern part of its range, this species is not yet threatened.

== Historical material ==
In his description of the species, Buffon says that he kept one of these eagles in captivity and observed its behavior. The captive bird ate mice and frogs, and he states that the Jean-de-blanc was well known by French farmers for raiding poultry.

== Gallery ==
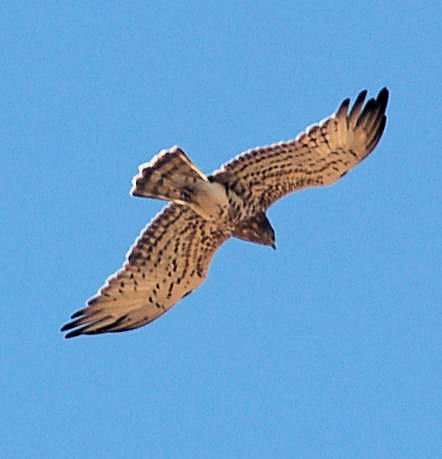
Characteristic white underside

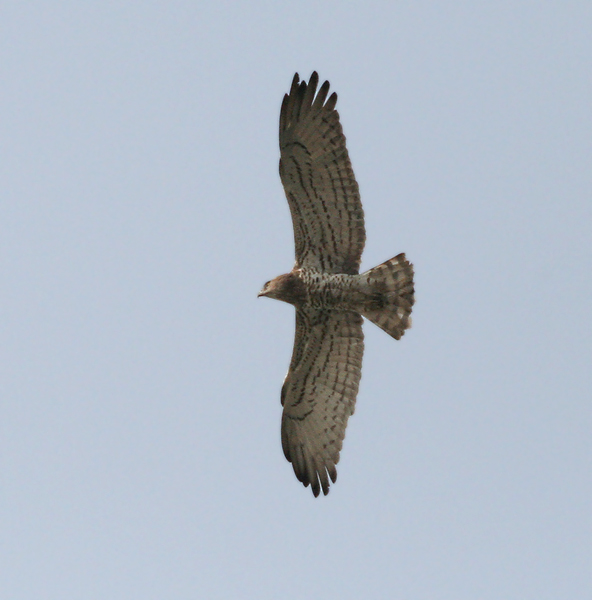
In Kawal Wildlife Sanctuary, India

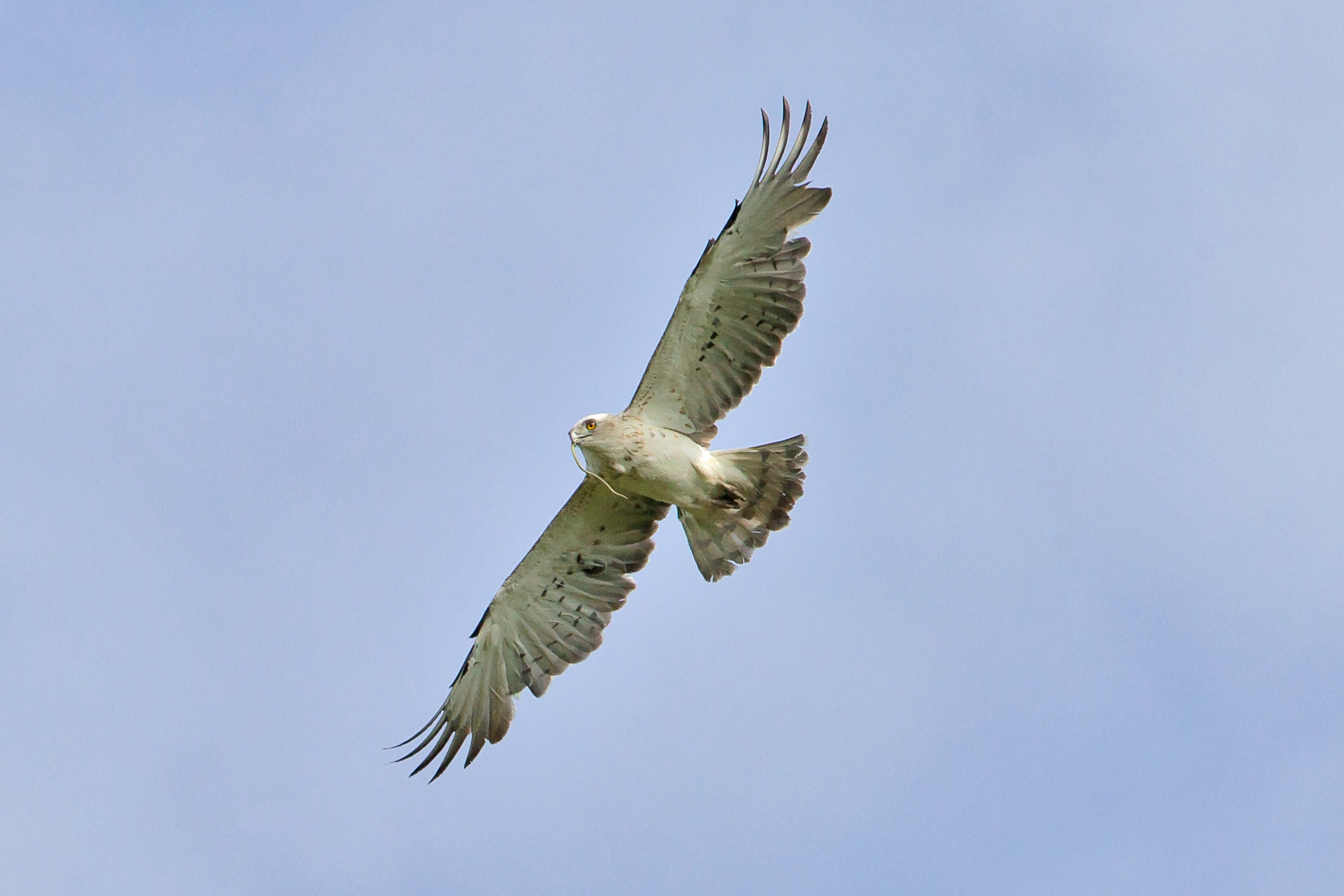
Swallowing prey while flying

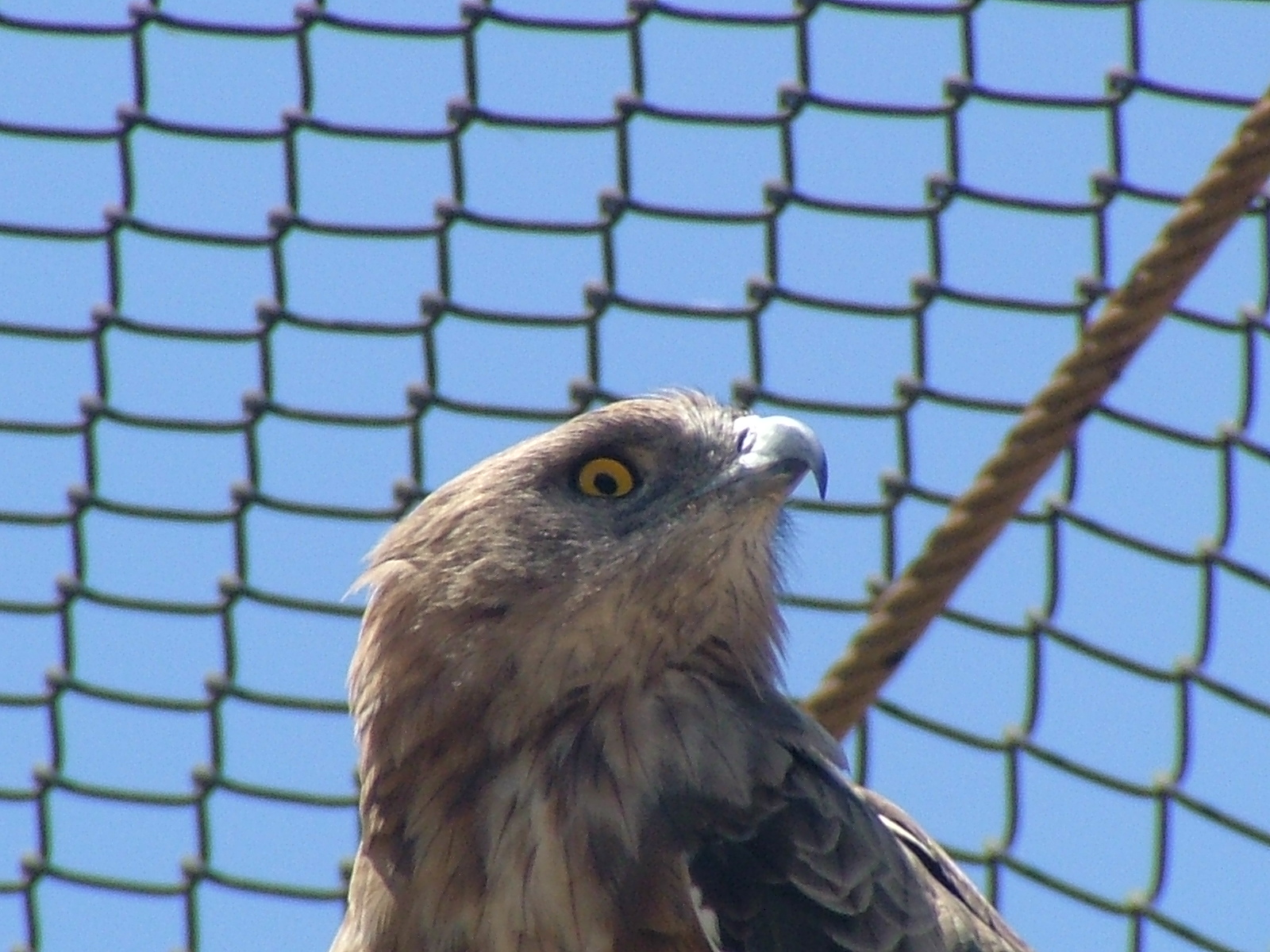
Yellow eyes

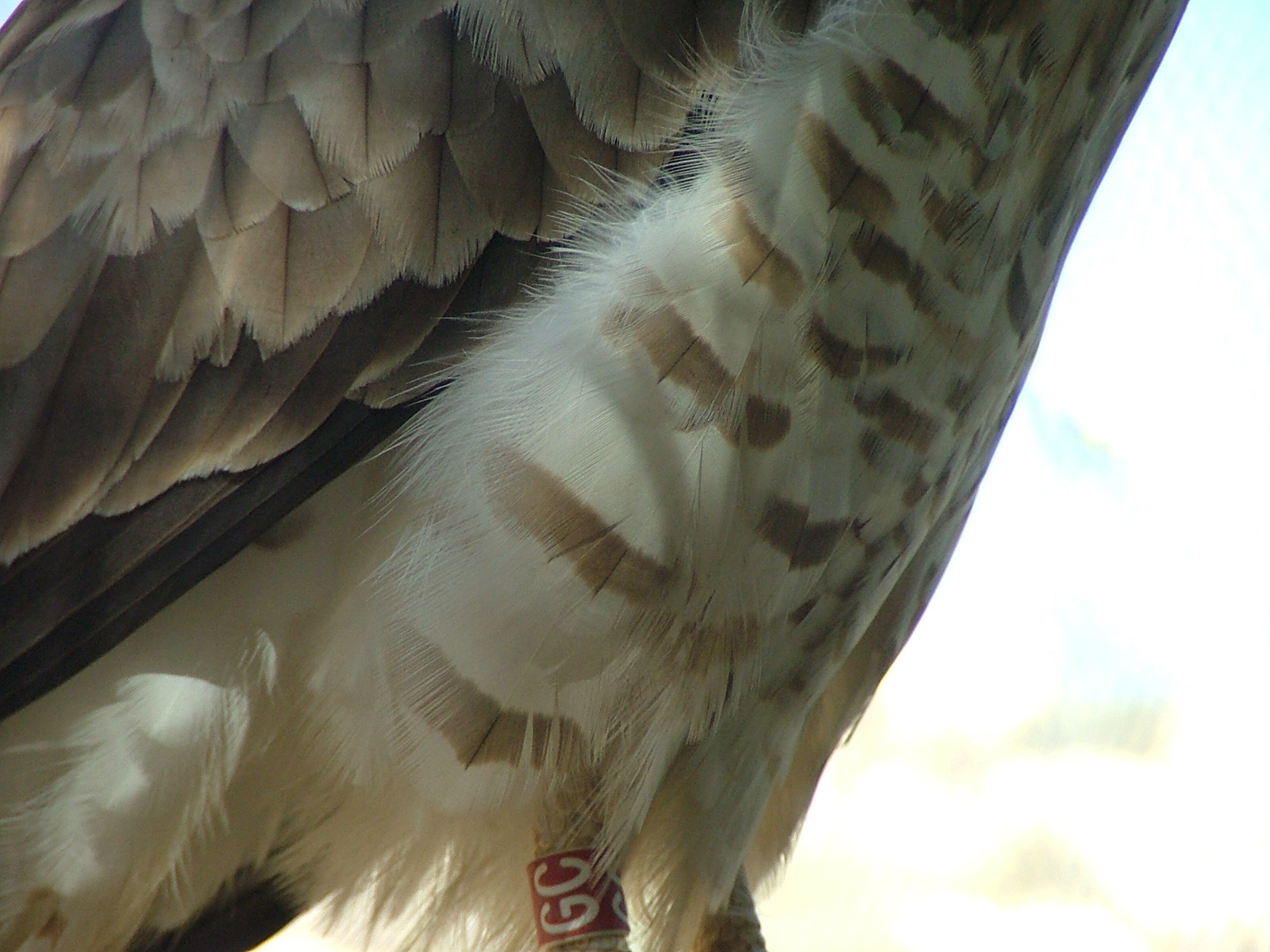
Detail of the feathers

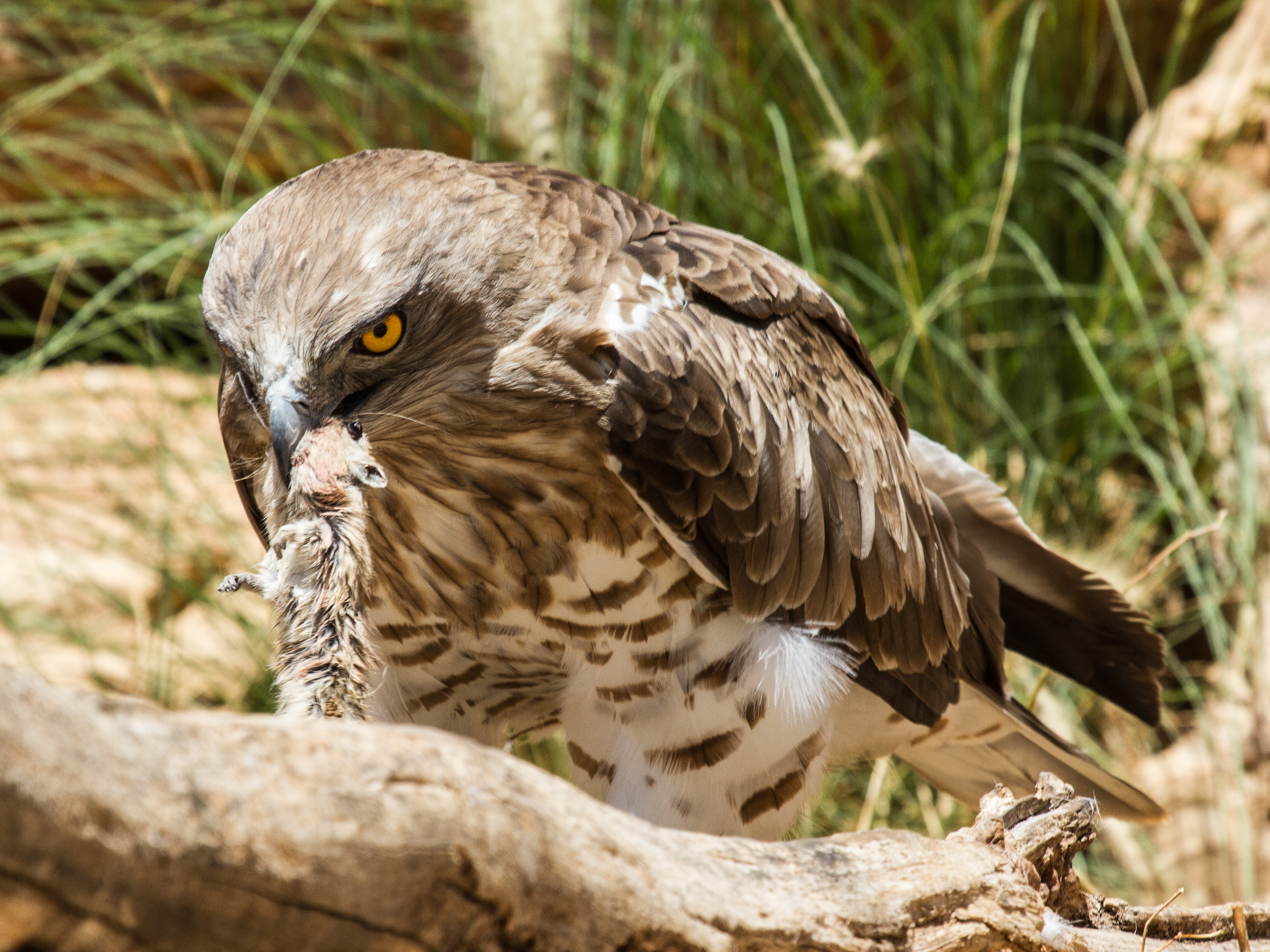
With a rat

Hovering

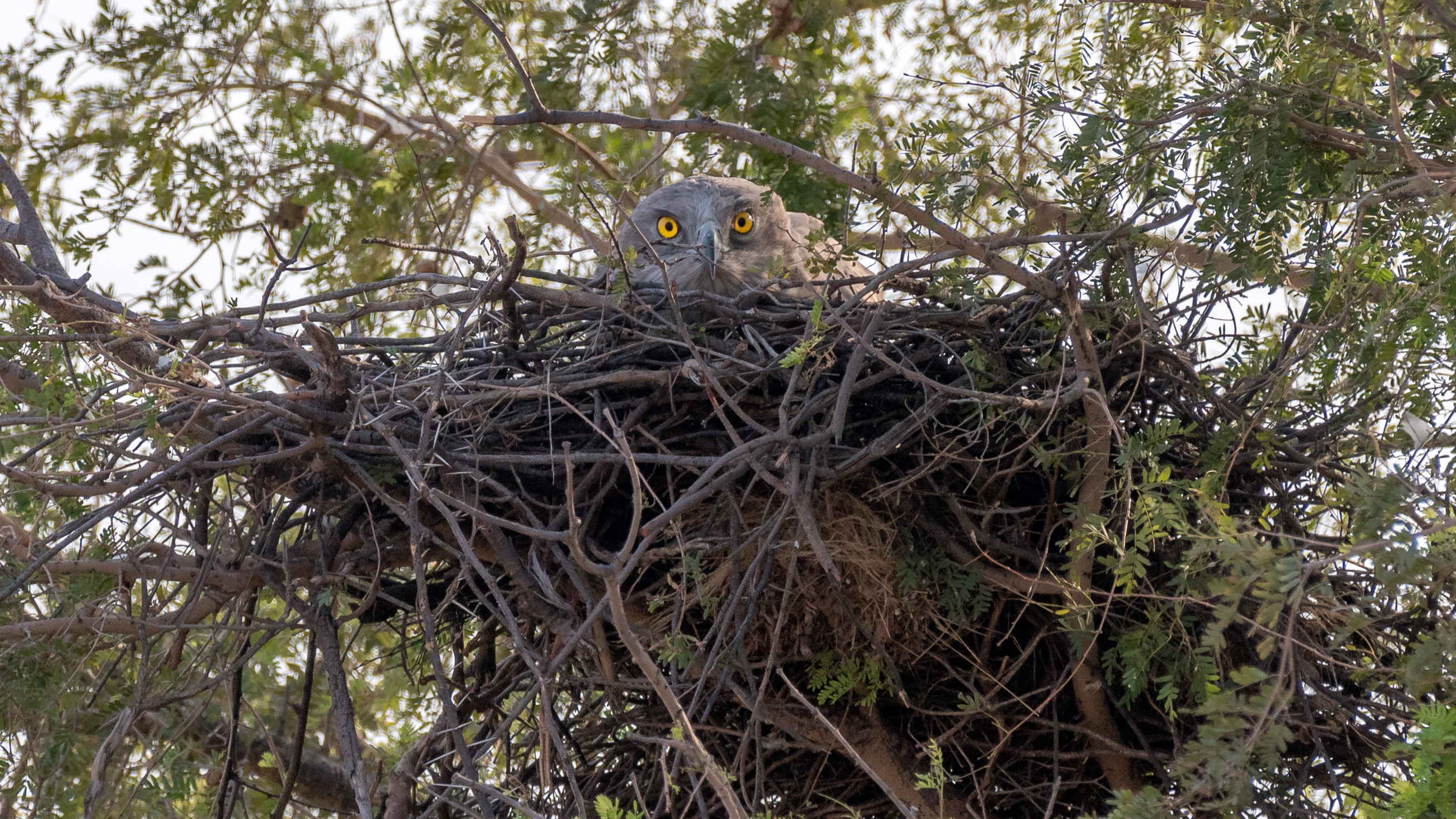
Short-toed snake eagle in its nest, Rollapadu wildlife sanctuary, Andhra Pradesh, India

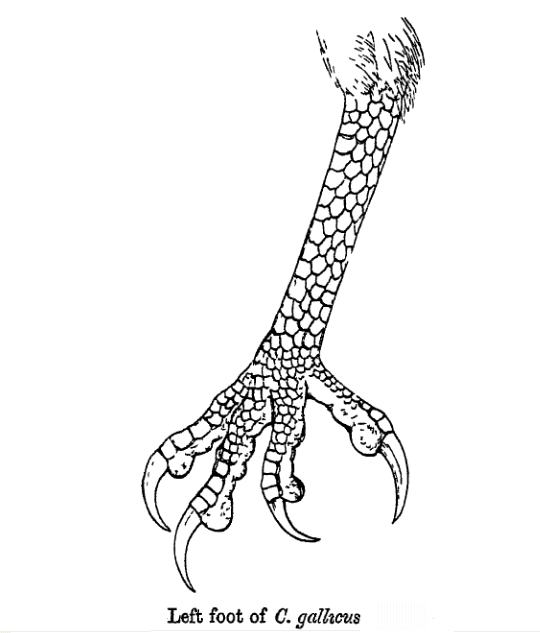
The short toes that give the name

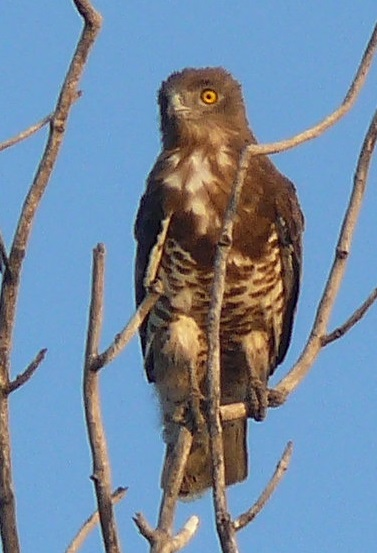
Near Kunszentmiklós, Hungary

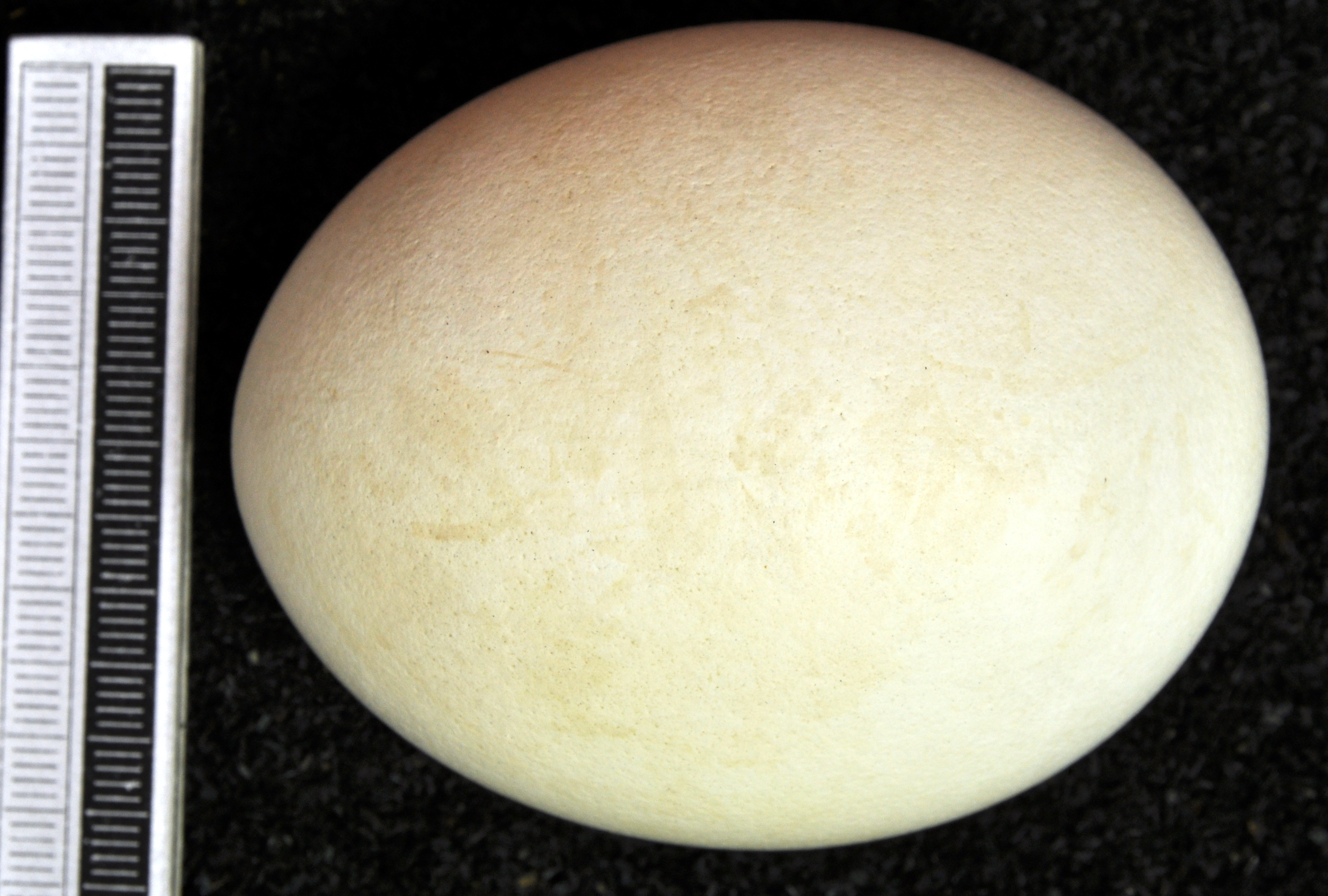
Egg, Collection Museum Wiesbaden

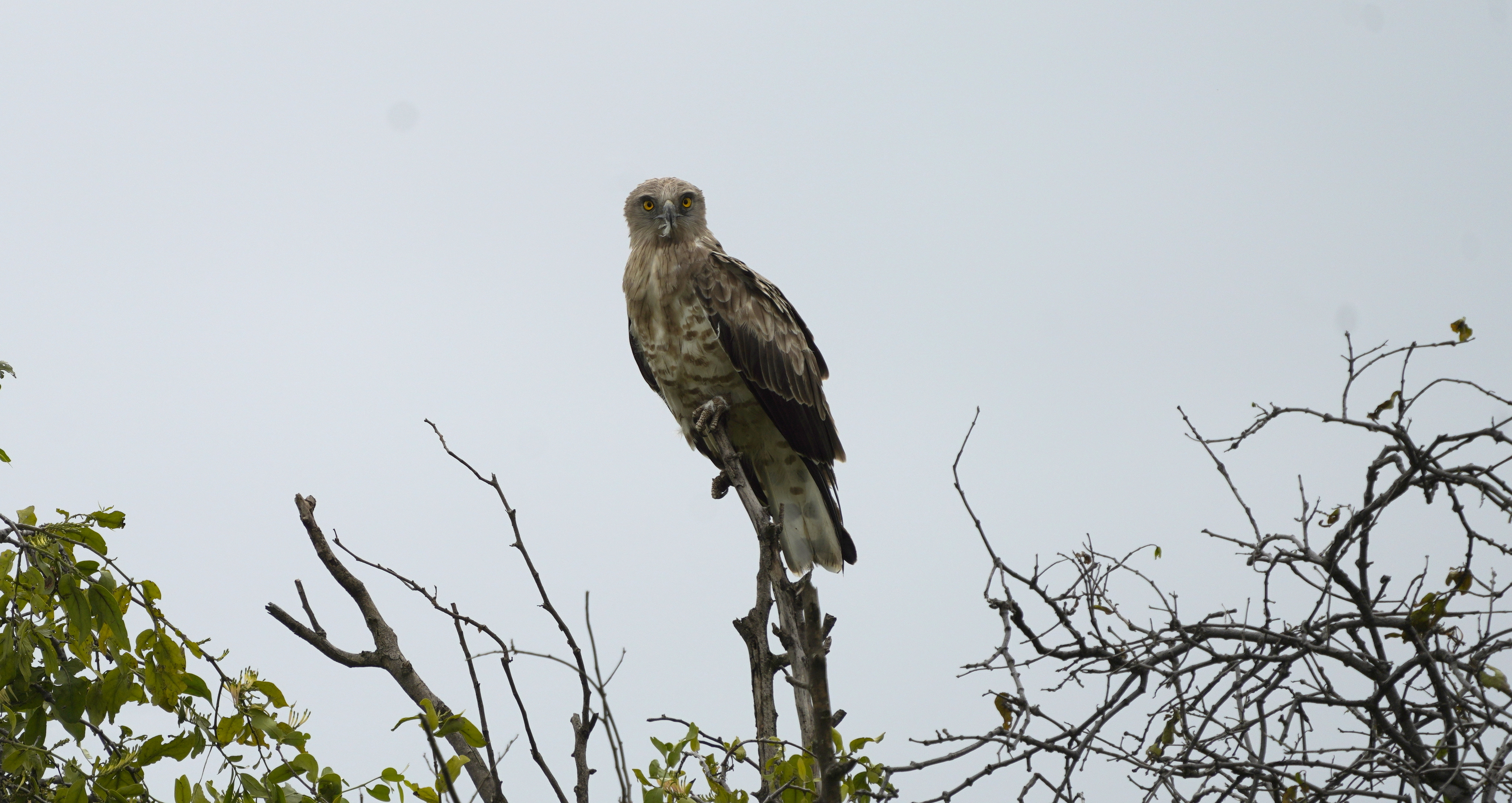
Short-toed snake eagle. Saswad, Pune, India.

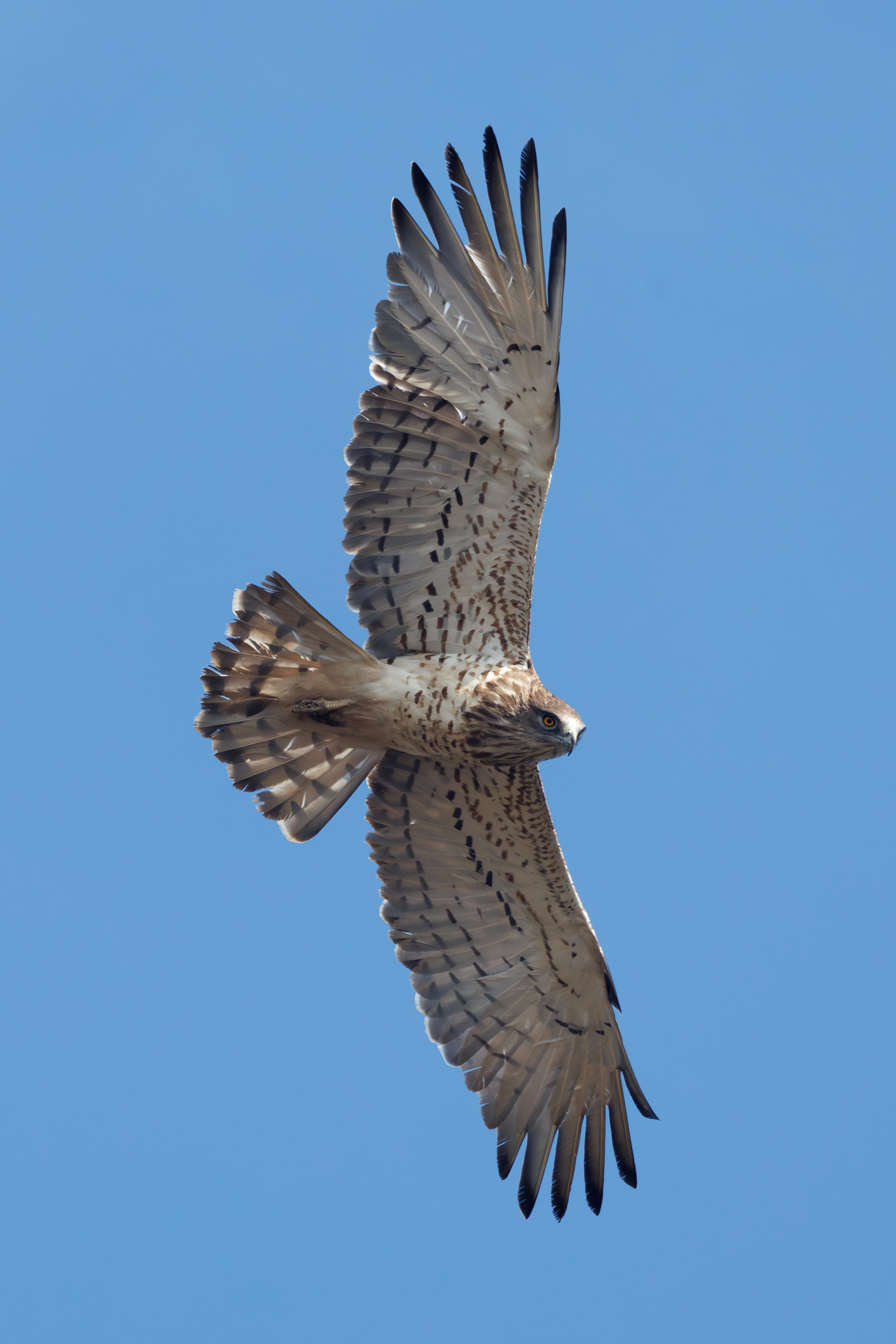
Short-toed snake eagle. Samos, Greece.
