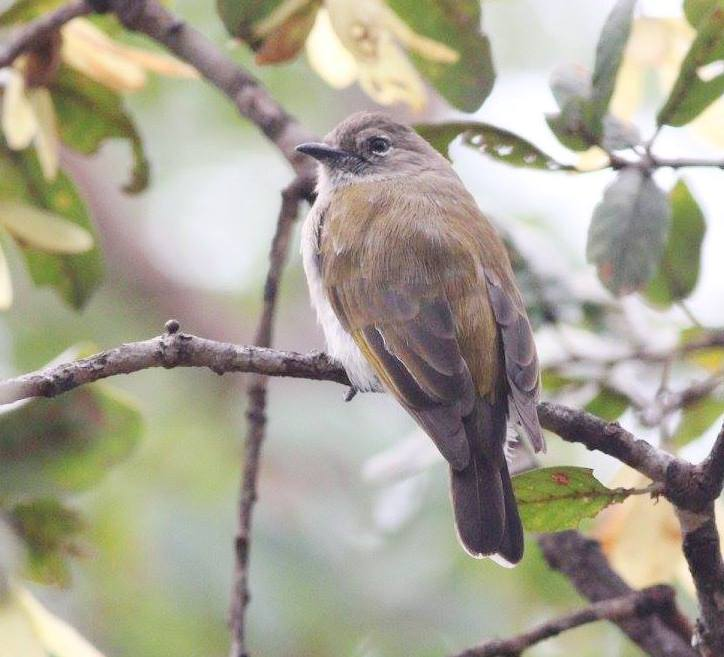

Conservation status
- Least Concern (IUCN 3.1)

Scientific classification
- Kingdom: Animalia
- Phylum: Chordata
- Class: Aves
- Order: Piciformes
- Family: Indicatoridae
- Genus: Prodotiscus
- Species: P. zambesiae

Binomial name
- Prodotiscus zambesiae Shelley, 1894
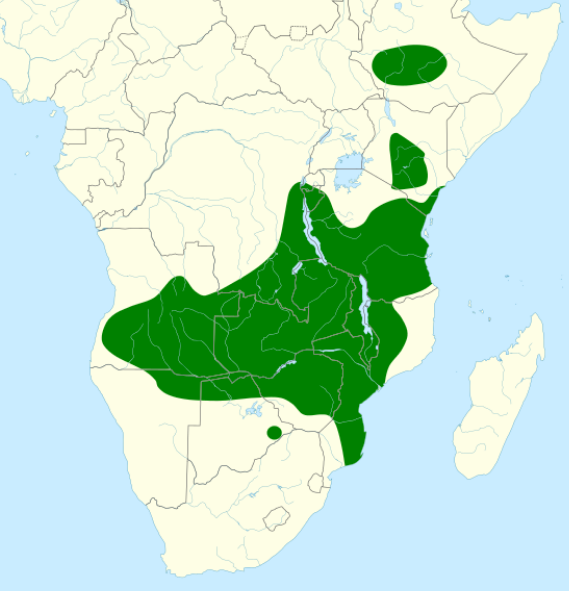
- range

= Green-backed honeybird =

Species of bird

The green-backed honeybird (Prodotiscus zambesiae), also known as the eastern green-backed honeyguide, green-backed honeyguide and slender-billed honeyguide, is a species of bird in the family Indicatoridae. It is a nest parasite of three white-eye species. It is an insectivore that sometimes eats the waxy shed of scaly insects.

== Description ==
The adult green-backed honeybird of both sexes has ashy-gray, sometimes white, underparts, which is considered an adaptation to its environment. Its upperparts are gray-green, and its outer tail feathers, including the tips, are white. Between the back and the side, it has a white patch that can be raised upright. Its beak and legs are black. In Angola, this species is greener, less golden, and overall darker than in other areas. In Central Ethiopia, it is also darker. The juvenile is duller than the adult. It is greyer, paler, yellower above and yellowish-brown below. Younglings have an orangish mouth opening.

Its upperparts are more greyish compared to the greener Cassin’s honeybird. This closely related species is darker, olive or greenish on its underparts while the green-backed honeybird is paler, especially on its belly. Otherwise, the two species are quite similar. Another similar species is the brown-backed honeybird. Comparatively, the green-backed honeybird is greener and has no dusky tips on the white outer tail feathers. This bird has a thinner, pointed bill, unlike other Indicator species.

On average, the green-backed honeybird measures 11 cm. Its body mass is about 10.2g, but it can vary between 9 and 16.5g. Its wing length is about 71-77mm, but can be shorter in central Ethiopia.

== Taxonomy and systematics ==
The green-backed honeybird is in the order Piciformes, like the woodpeckers and toucans. Just like most birds in this order, it has zygodactyl feet, meaning that it has an X-shaped foot with two digits, the second and third, in the front and two digits in the back. Honeybirds are more closely related to woodpeckers and friends than to the other Piciformes families. Together, they form the superfamily Picoidea. The green-backed honeybird is in the family Indicatoridae, which includes the greater honeyguide, a species famous for guiding humans to bee hives. Most species in this family are small insectivorous birds; this species is the smallest in mass. Some species in the family, in the green-baked honeybird’s genus, Prodotiscus, eat the waxy shedded shell or skin of scale insects.

The green-backed honeybird is closely related to the Cassin's honeybird (Prodotiscus insignis) and was once treated as a single species by Friedmann, a prominent figure in honeybird research. Their plumages are different, they are unlikely to hybridize, and their behaviours differ. Their range is also different; the Cassin’s honeybird is mostly a West African species, while the Green-backed honeybird is mostly Eastern and Southern African. Shelley (1894) first pointed out the differences between the Cassin’s and green-backed honeybirds when he observed a juvenile specimen and gave it its Latin name.

Three subspecies are recognized: Prodotiscus zambesiae lathburyi, Prodotiscus zambesiae ellenbecki, and Prodotiscus zambesiae zambesiae. They are divided by location and specific physical differences. P. z. Zambesiae is found from central Angola to the southern Democratic Republic of the Congo. It is also found in South Tanzania, Namibia, and Mozambique. P. z. ellenbecki is found in Southern Ethiopia, Kenya, and Northern Tanzania. Lastly, P. z. Lathburyi is found in west central Angola.

== Distribution and habitat ==
It is found in Angola, Botswana, Democratic Republic of the Congo, Kenya, Malawi, Mozambique, Namibia, Tanzania, Zambia, and Zimbabwe.

This species prefers woodland habitats, forest edges, gardens, forest canopies, and moist woods. Forest canopy is important for foraging, and this bird can also frequent the lower parts of trees and bushes. It inhabits forests with Baikiaea, Brachylaena, Croton, Olea, and miombo (Brachystegia). It is occasionally found near degraded Cryptosephalum. The green-backed honeybird prefers high altitudes of a minimum of 300m and up to 2100m above sea level. Usually, this species prefers areas above 900m in elevation. Migration patterns are unknown, but its unpredictable presence in certain regions, such as Kenya, may suggest it moves from one place to another. Often, it disappears from areas for extended periods, which means it may wander.

== Behaviour ==
=== Breeding ===
Not much is known about the courtship display of this species. Observers have noticed that it possibly calls over the treetops. Two to four birds may fly about, fan their tail, hold their wings vertically as they reach for another, glide, and drop behind the potential mate. Otherwise, if it is perched, it may potentially bow to the other with its white patch on the tail feathers erected. During or after the rainy season, this honeybird starts laying eggs. In the North, the dates are from April to July, and in December and February. In the South, it’s from August to October.

This bird is a brood parasite, meaning it lays its eggs in other species’ nests and uses those species to care for its young. The green-backed honeybird itself does not provide parental care, nor does it build nests for its juveniles. Its primary hosts are mainly three species of white-eyes: the Abyssinian white-eye, the Ethiopian white-eye, and the Northern yellow white-eye. It also uses the amethyst sunbird, a few flycatchers, and the Southern black-tit. The black-tit does not nest in a cup-shaped nest like the other hosts, but in holes in trees. Females lay two or more small white or pale blue eggs per breeding season. The pale blue eggs are only recorded in the South. The eggs are about 15mm by 12mm. Most of the time, the female lays one egg per host nest, but occasionally, two may be found in the same nest. Only the juvenile honeybirds have been found in the host’s parasitised nest, implying that the other eggs were destroyed either by the mother or the young honeybird. The young birds have a tiny, hooked bill that they lose after 7 days. The host incubates the younglings for 13 days or less; the juveniles can fly after about 21 days but remain with the host for about another week. To beg for care, young green-backed honeybirds droop their wings and show their mouth opening to their host parents.

=== Food and feeding ===
This bird mostly eats spiders and insects like scale insects, termites, beetles, true bugs, moths, caterpillars, and flying insects. Unlike other species in its family, the green-backed honeybird does not eat beeswax, as it lacks the thick skin that the other honeyguides have. Still, it consumes waxy insect shed skin. This species sometimes eats seeds, Loranthus berries, and other fruits, such as mistletoe. When available, it may drink from bird baths.

The green-backed honeybird perches as it waits for its next meal. Once it has found its prey, it charges at the insect and catches it mid-air. This is called flycatching. In the air, it spread its tail, showing off its entirely white outer tips. It doesn’t always return to its perch directly; sometimes circling, zig-zagging, or fluttering to one side before going to another perch. It also creeps along the bark and leaf clusters, and searches among the moss and lichens for scaly insects. It may forage with flocks of sylviid warblers, cuckooshrikes, bulbuls, white-eyes, and weaver finches. Two or rarely three green-backed honeybirds forage together in these flocks, sometimes alongside Brown-backed honeybirds.

=== Vocalization ===
This honeybird species likely has a song that goes “Pee-wee-it” with three main notes. The “pee” is low and weak, followed by a higher, longer “wee,” which is the only part that can be heard at a distance. The last part of the song, the “it”, is sharper and faster. This song excites individuals, as it has been observed to cause another bird to spread its tail, hop around, and potentially answer with a call of its own. The green-backed honeybird may make a simple “fit” note or call out a “Skeee-aaa” as it flies or see another fly over during the courtship period. It may also emit a “tsit, tsit” call during courtship. The youngs chatter with a squeaky “tz-tz-tz”.
