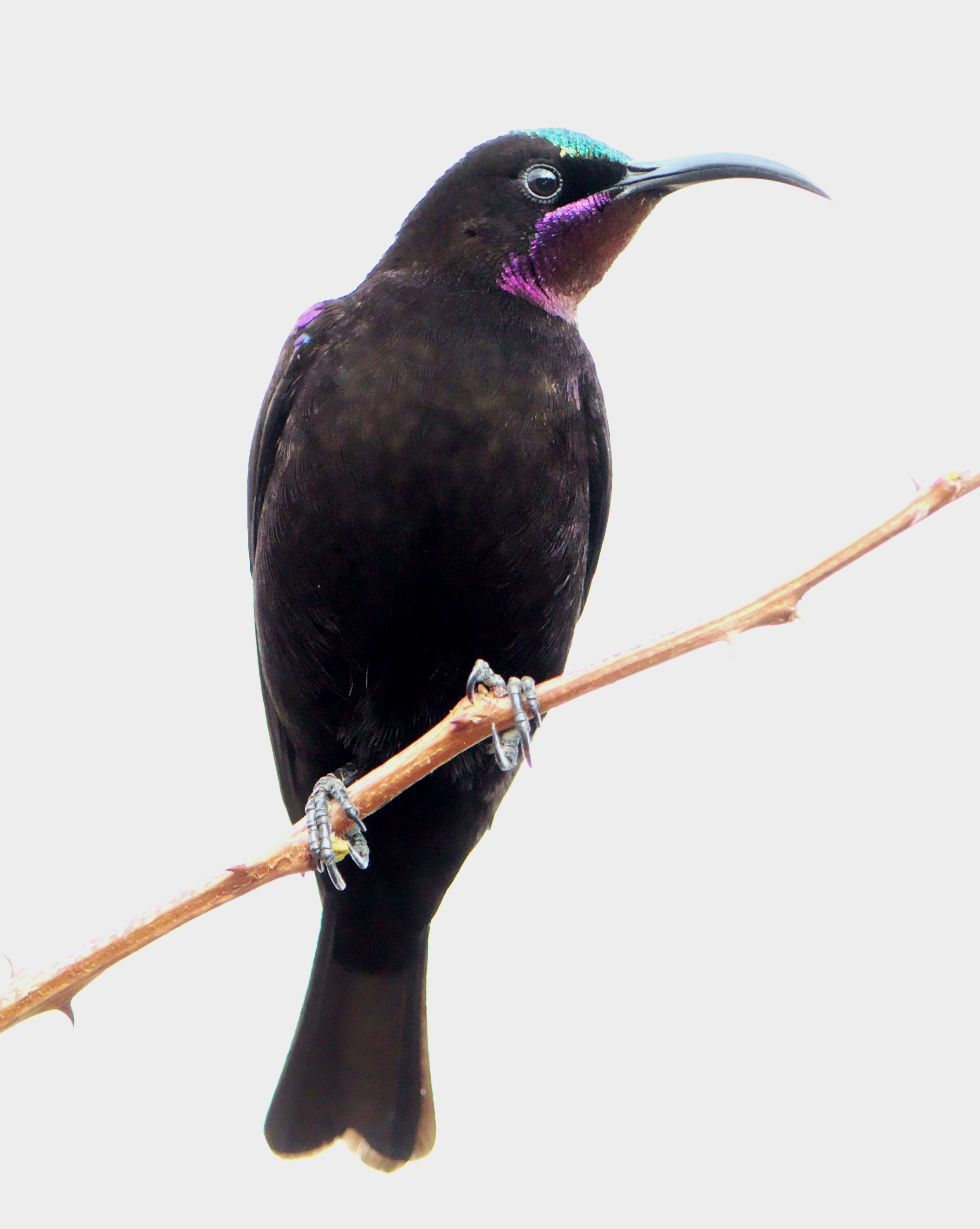

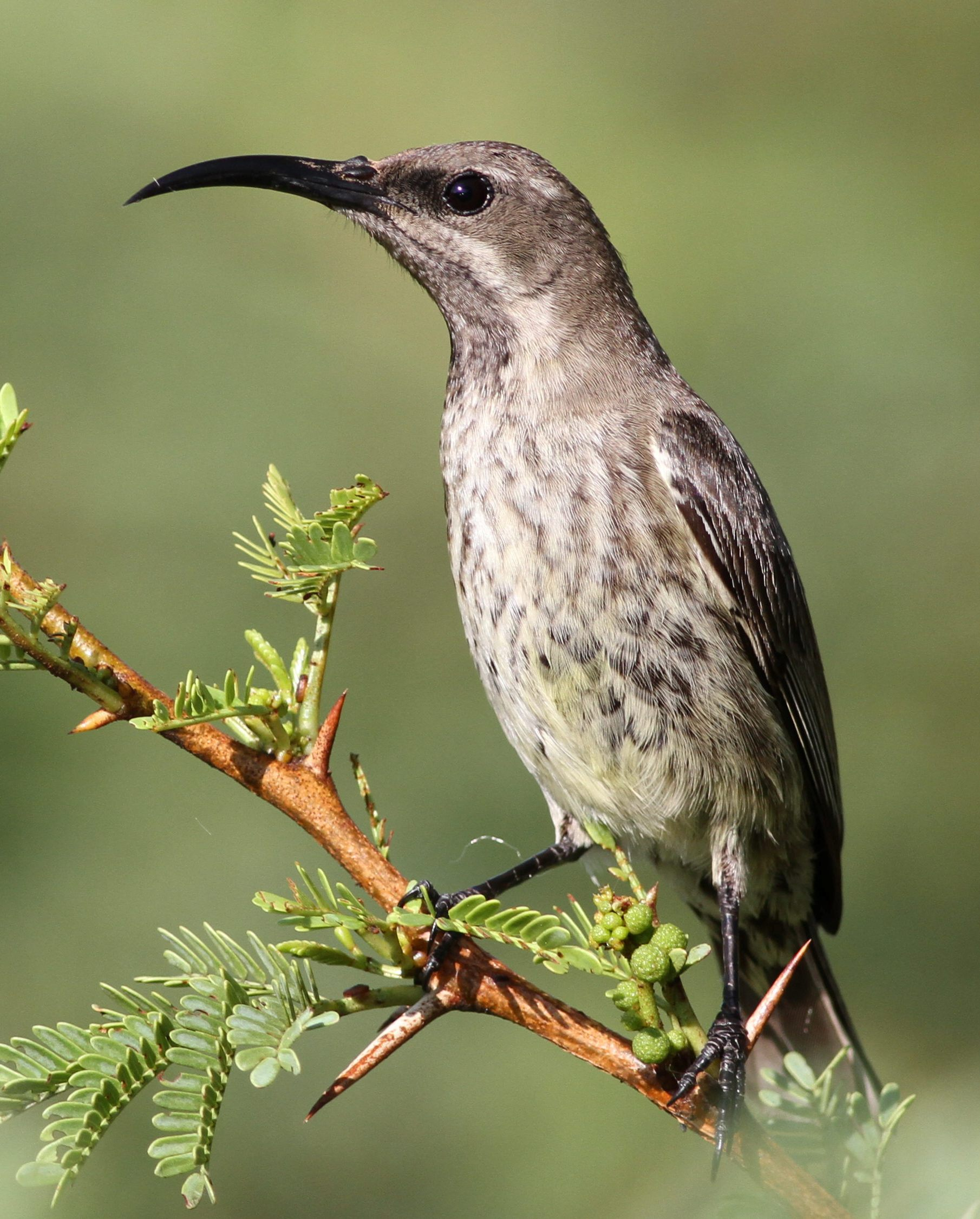
- Nominate male and female, South Africa Song recorded in KwaZulu-Natal, South Africa

Conservation status
- Least Concern (IUCN 3.1)

Scientific classification
- Kingdom: Animalia
- Phylum: Chordata
- Class: Aves
- Order: Passeriformes
- Family: Nectariniidae
- Genus: Chalcomitra
- Species: C. amethystina

Binomial name
- Chalcomitra amethystina (Shaw, 1812)

Synonyms
- Nectarinia amethystina

= Amethyst sunbird =

Species of bird

The amethyst sunbird, also called the black sunbird (Chalcomitra amethystina), is a species of passerine bird in the family Nectariniidae. It is native to the Afrotropics, mostly south of the equator. They are commonly found in well-watered habitats, and undertake seasonal movements to visit flowering woodlands. The demise of some woodlands have impacted their numbers locally, but their range has also expanded along with the spread of wooded gardens.

== Habits ==
Though mostly found singly or in pairs, larger numbers may concentrate at favourite flowering trees, where they act aggressively towards other sunbird species. The complex song is a loud, sustained twittering. Food includes emergent termites, spiders and nectar. In courtship a male will hop about a branch near a female, drop one wing, then the other, and finally both wings. The wings will then be fluttered and displayed. A responsive female may lower her head, and assume a rigid posture.

== Nesting ==
Breeding pairs of amethyst sunbird are widely spaced, and the female builds the nest. Favoured trees include exotic eucalypts and pines, and are often close to buildings or human activity. Nests are attached to a drooping branch, below the canopy, or hidden by foliage. Nests are built from fine grass stems, which are bound together with cobwebs. The nest is often decorated with lichens, or other debris. Two speckled eggs are laid, but successive clutches may be raised from the same nest in a single season. Nests are parasitized by green-backed honeybird and Klaas's cuckoo.

== Habitat and movements ==
Amethyst sunbirds are widespread residents of woodland, mesic savanna, forest edge and suburban gardens. They occur only sparsely in dry savanna or low dry regions, where they keep to riparian woods or concentrations of nectar-bearing plants, and are decidedly scarce in the Limpopo valley and mopane regions. A distinct summer influx is notable in the Zambezi valley and Great Zimbabwe woodlands, and they are strictly summer visitors (September/October to April) to the Kalahari sand (or Gusu) woodlands, where they appear in high densities when the Baikiaea trees are in flower. On seaward-facing slopes, they are very common residents up to 1,800 metres, with high reporting rates in afromontane forest and valley bushveld.

== Adaptations ==
The average hematocrit level for birds is between 30 and 45%; however, the Amethyst Sunbird has an average hematocrit level of 50%. Amethyst sunbirds can be found along an altitudinal gradient in South Africa from the Drakensberg mountain range to the coast of KwaZulu-Natal. During warmer months, the sunbird's hematocrit levels will increase with higher altitudes (where there is also a dramatic drop in temperature) and with lower oxygen concentrations in the atmosphere. Higher hematocrit levels may be attributed to its small body size and can help with oxygen carrying capacity and the metabolic cost of flying.

Subpopulations of Amethyst Sunbirds show variation in their resting metabolic rates, basal metabolic rate, and thermal neutral zones based on the subpopulation's acclimation to different altitudes. Those more acclimated to high altitudes would have lower metabolic rates and a larger thermal neutral zone. Therefore, the Amethyst Sunbird can change its physiology in response to altitude and temperature to achieve a metabolic rate and temperature regulation best suited for its environment.

== Status ==
On the Mashonaland plateau, race kirkii has declined in favour of scarlet-chested sunbird, after fragmentation of its native miombo woodlands. In South Africa, the range of the nominate race has increased along with the spread of wooded gardens.

== Range ==
It occurs in Angola, Botswana, Burundi, Republic of the Congo, Democratic Republic of the Congo, Eswatini, Ethiopia, Gabon, Kenya, Malawi, Mozambique, Namibia, Somalia, South Africa, South Sudan, Tanzania, Uganda, Zambia and Zimbabwe, Nigeria.

== Races ==
Between three and eleven races have been proposed, including:

- C. a. amethystina

Range: South Africa, southern Botswana, Eswatini
Description: Fairly distinct: bill heavy, females dark from throat to belly, males have tail coverts metallic purple

- C. a. kirkii (Shelley, 1876)

Range: Zimbabwe to East Africa
Description: Bill finer than nominate, females much lighter on underside, males with dark brown (not purple) tail coverts

- C. a. kalckreuthi (Cabanis, 1878)

Range: coastal Tanzania and Kenya
Description: Bill slender, females pale below, unmarked on throat, supercilium long, males may have metallic purple upper tail coverts; often merged with C. a. kirkii

- C. a. deminuta Cabanis, 1880

Range: West African tropics

- C. a. doggetti (Sharpe, 1902)

Range: western Kenya

- C. a. adjuncta (Clancey, 1975)

Range: Eswatini
Description: Similar to nominate, with which it is often merged

== Gallery ==
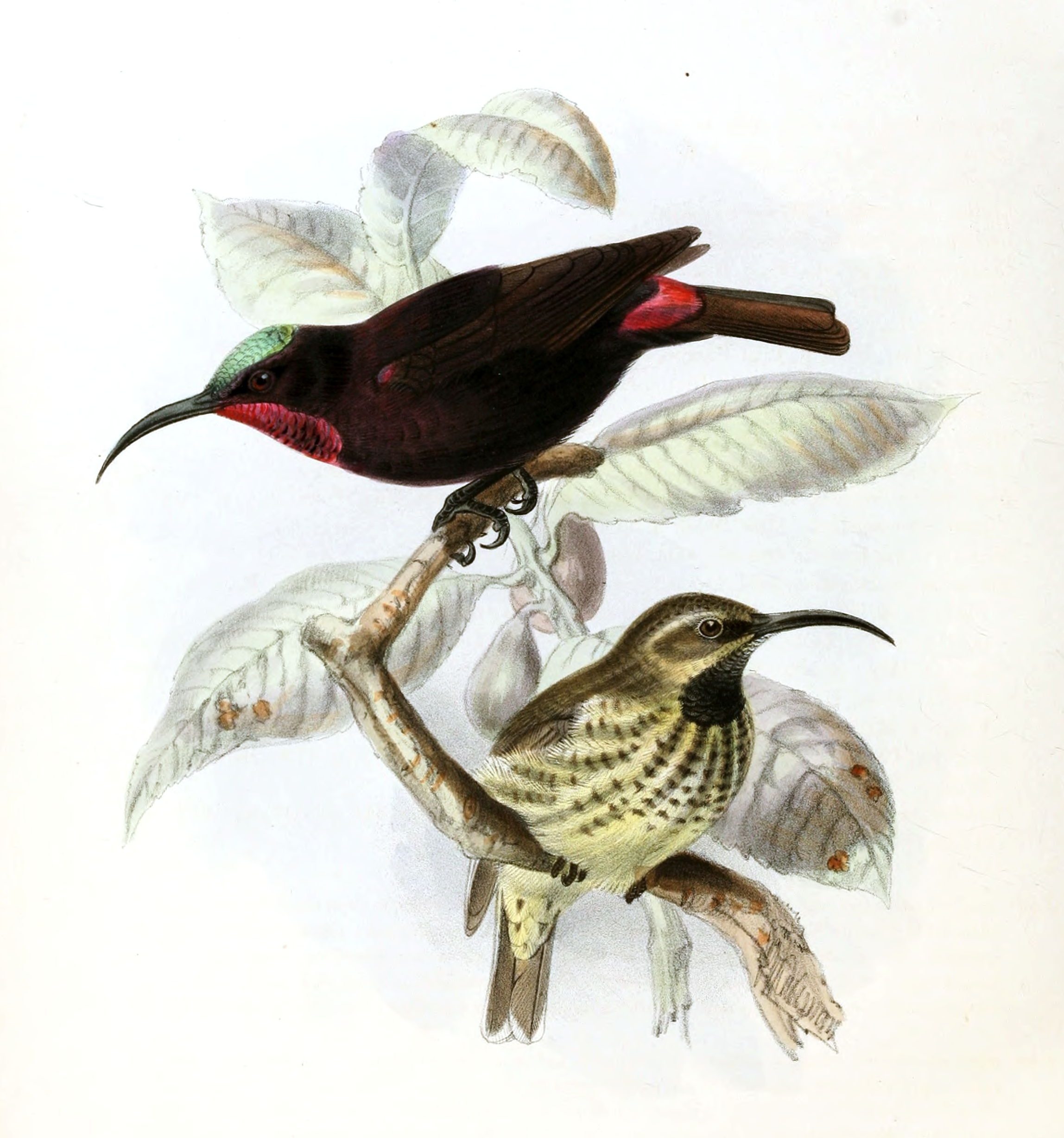
C. a. amethystina pair by J. G. Keulemans

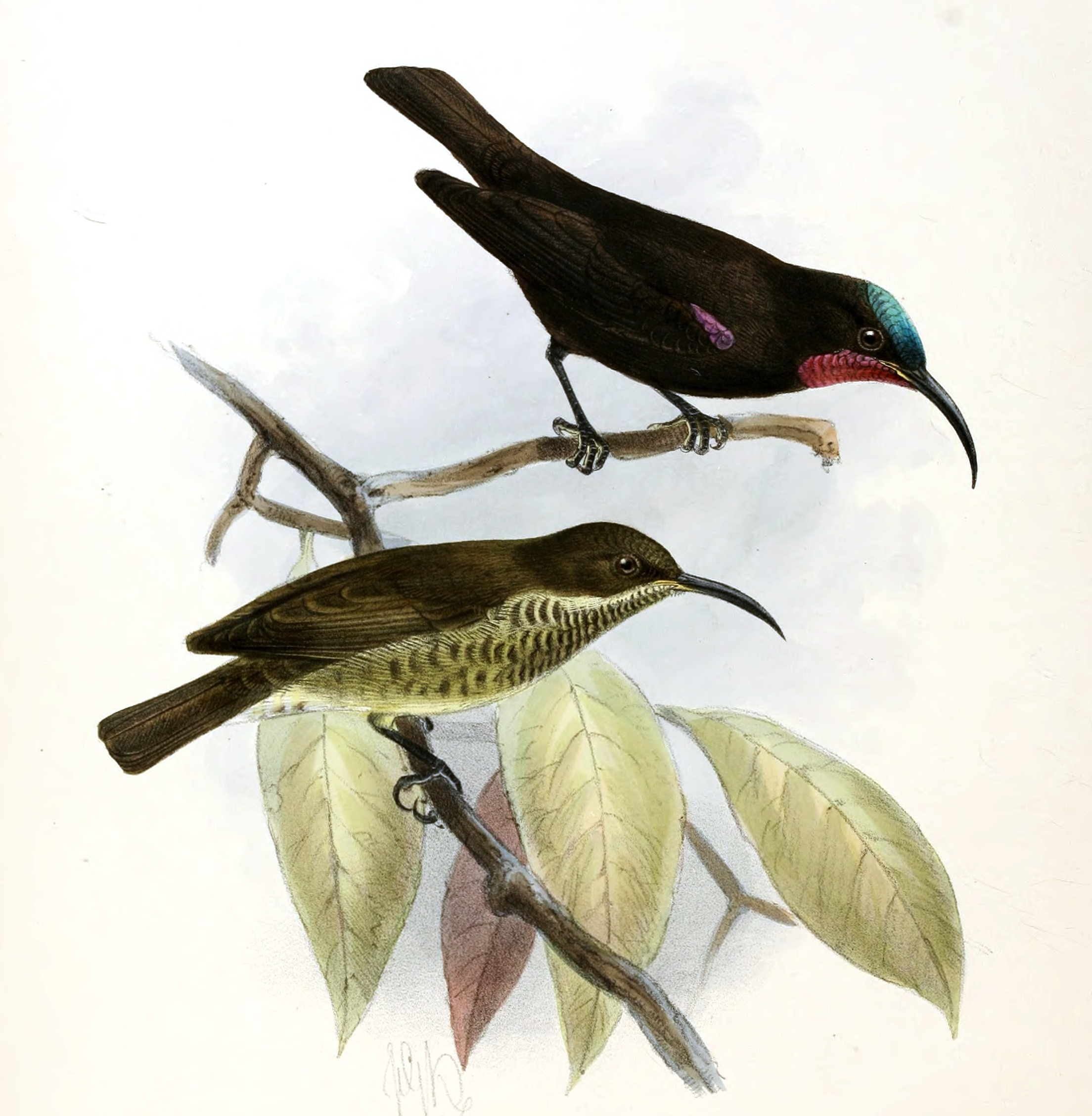
C. a. kirkii pair by J. G. Keulemans

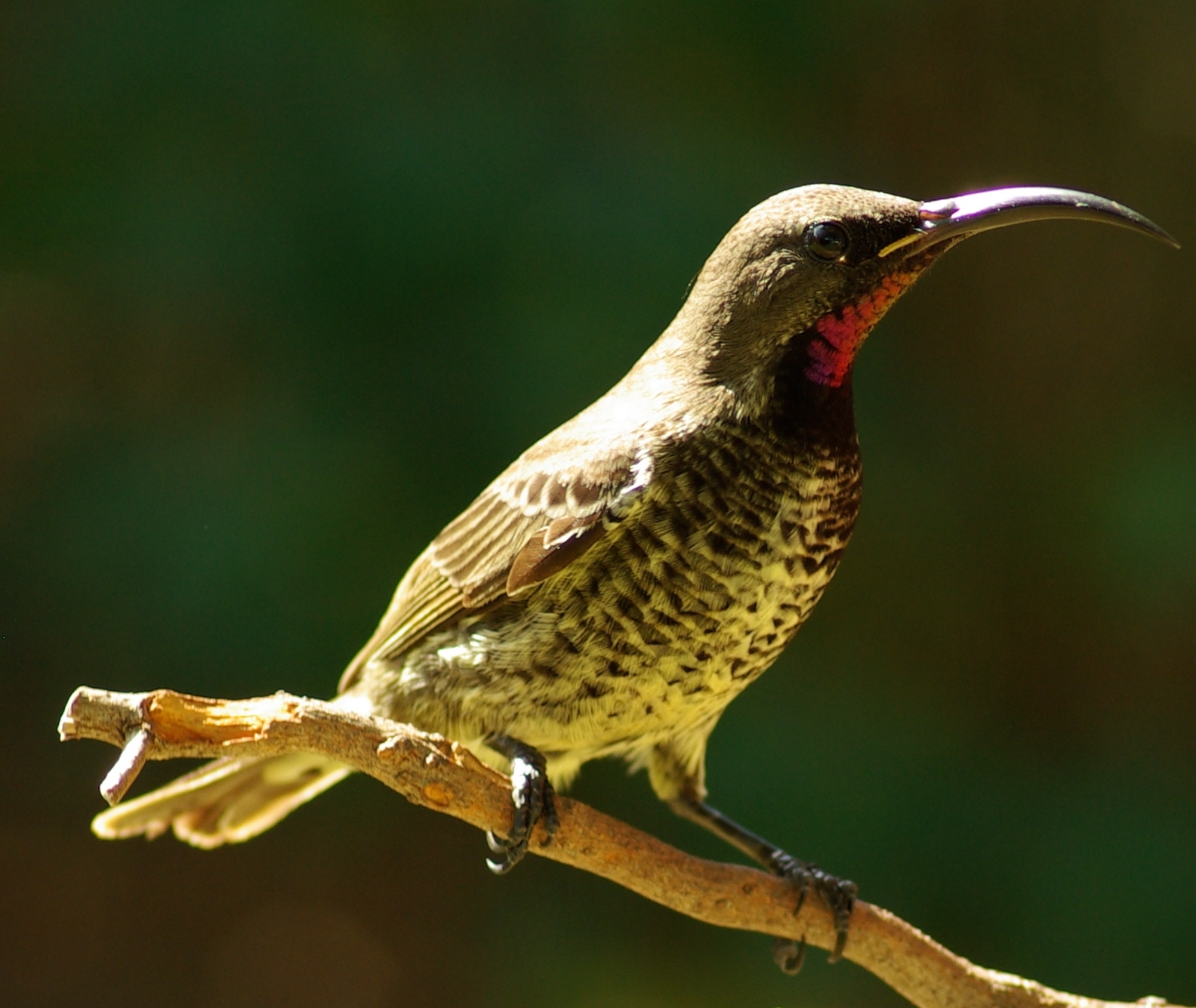
Juvenile male of the nominate race

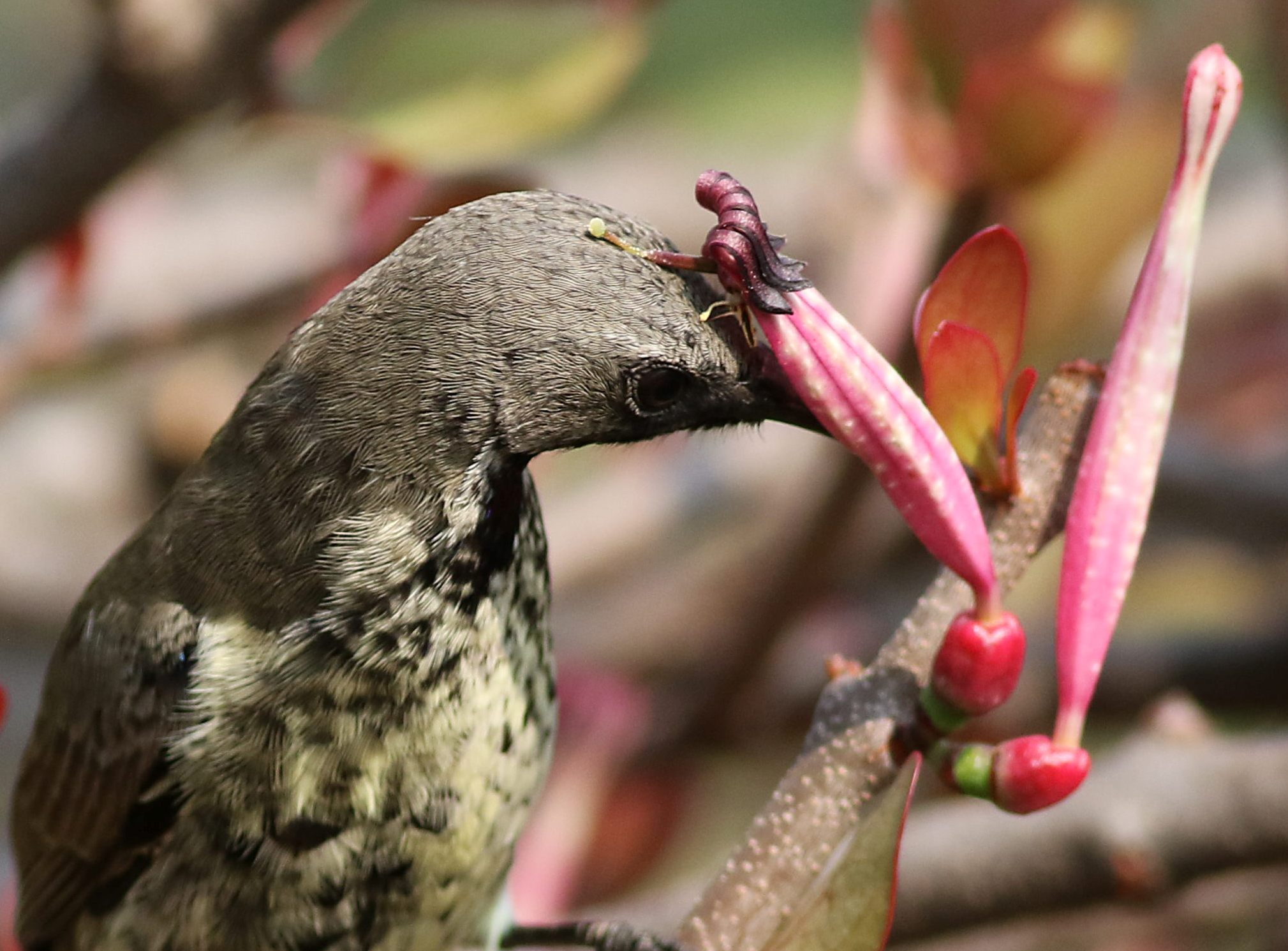
Juvenile male feeding on mistletoe nectar

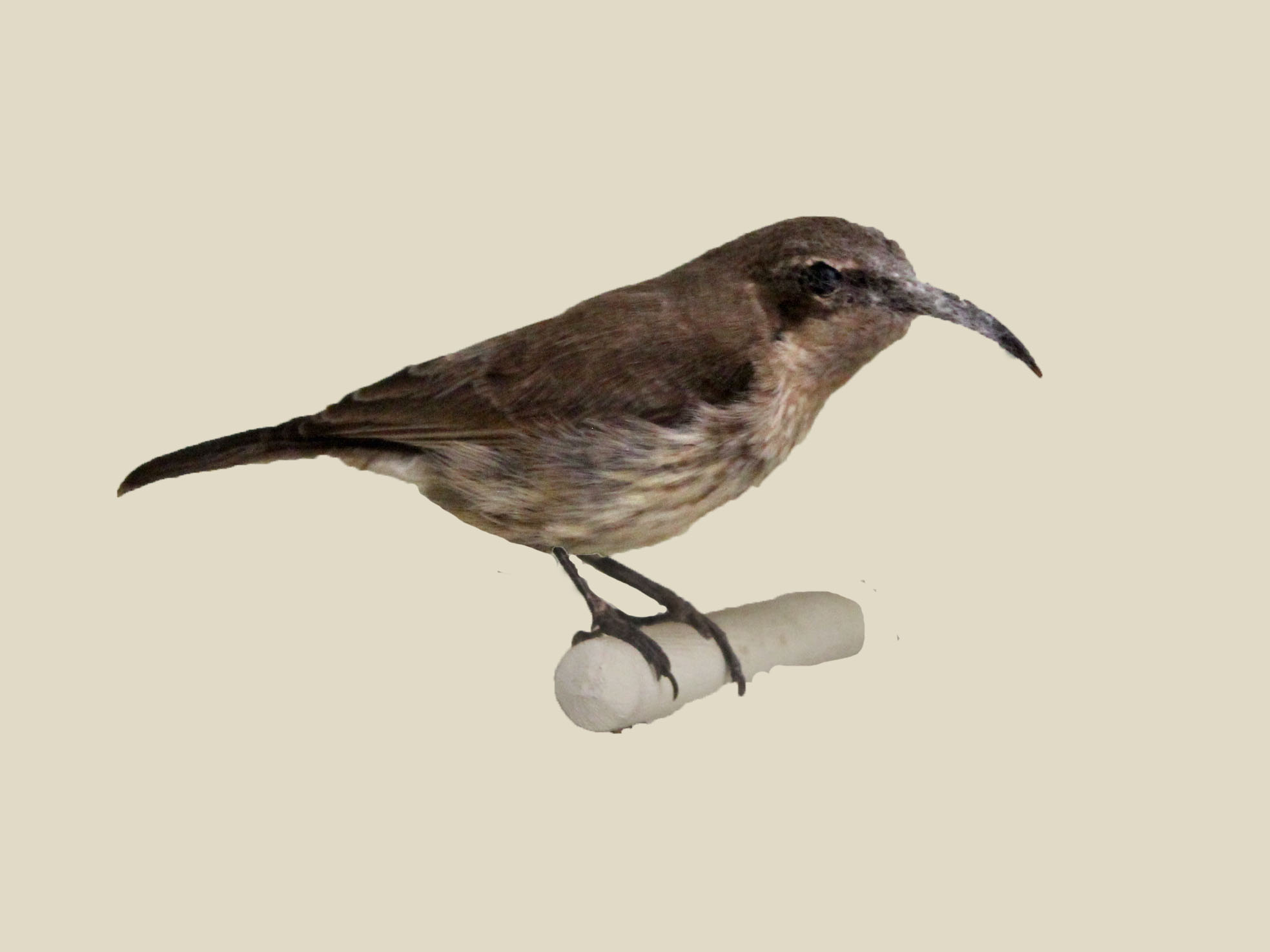
Female specimen, perhaps C. a. kirkii, Kenya

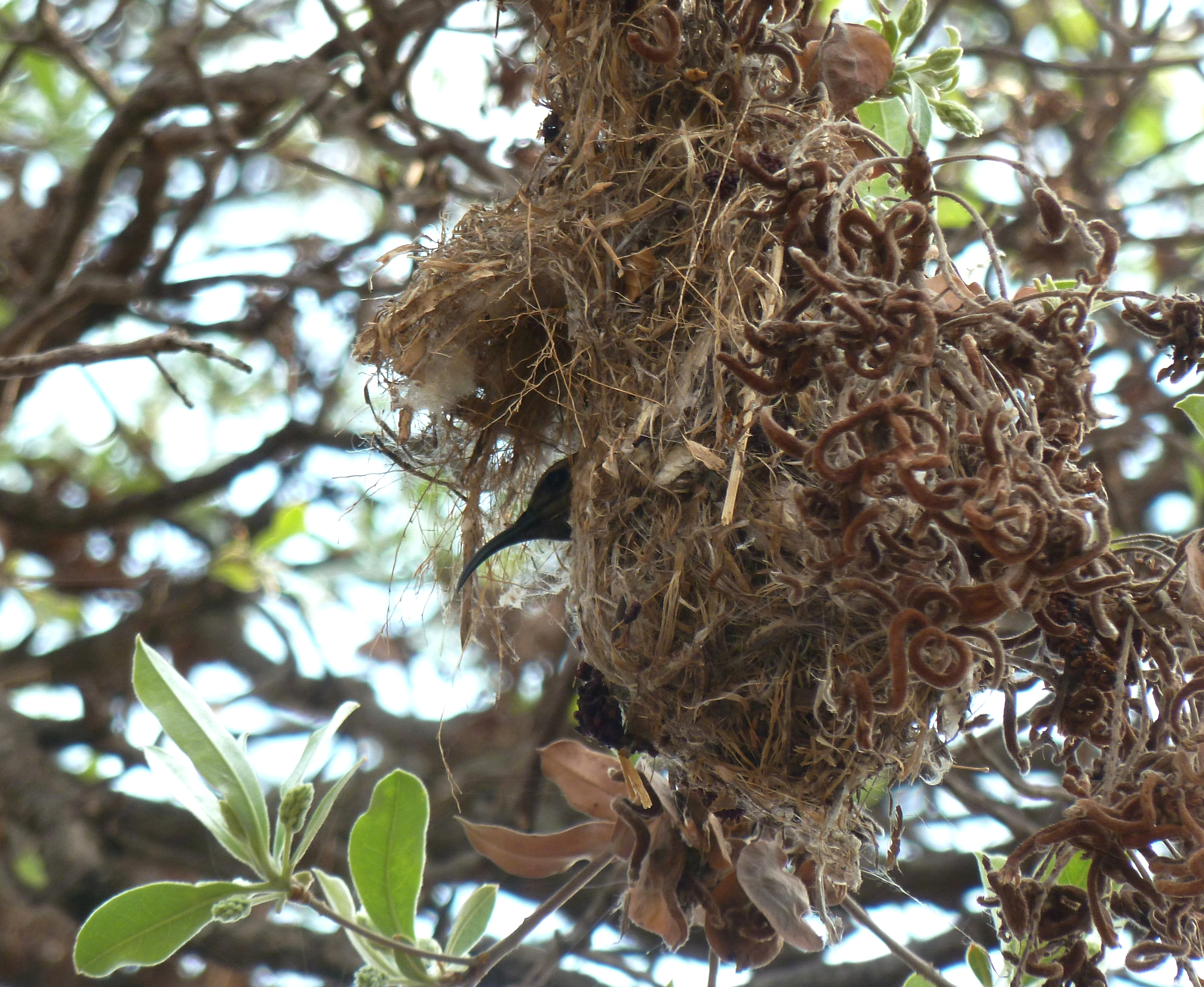
Female in nest suspended from low tree branch
