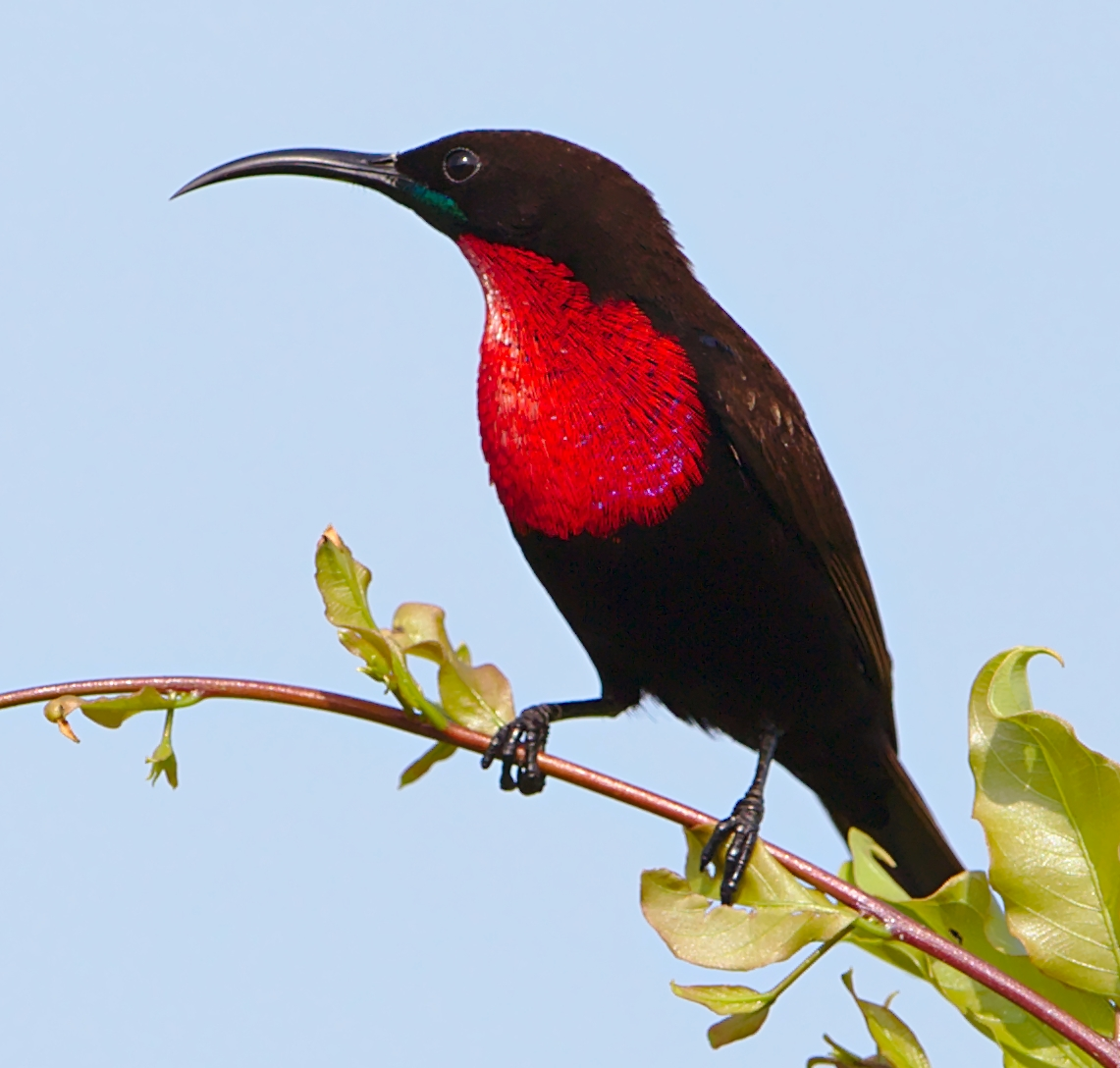
- An adult male Scarlet-chested sunbird (C. senegalensis) in South Africa

Scientific classification
- Kingdom: Animalia
- Phylum: Chordata
- Class: Aves
- Order: Passeriformes
- Family: Nectariniidae
- Genus: Chalcomitra; Reichenbach, 1853

Type species
- Certhia amethystina Shaw, 1812

Species
- See text

= Chalcomitra =

Genus of birds

Chalcomitra is a genus of African sunbirds. Its members are sometimes included in Nectarinia.

The sunbirds are a group of very small Old World passerine birds which feed largely on nectar, although they will also take insects, especially when feeding young. Flight is fast and direct on their short wings. Most species can take nectar by hovering like a hummingbird, but usually perch to feed most of the time.

The genus Chalcomitra was introduced by the German naturalist Ludwig Reichenbach in 1853. The type species was subsequently designated as Certhia amethystina Shaw, 1812, the amethyst sunbird. The name Chalcomitra is from the Ancient Greek khalkomitros "wearing a bronze head-band", from khalkos "bronze" and mitra "diadem".

== Species ==
Its members are:

Male	Female	Common name	Scientific name	Distribution
		Buff-throated sunbird	Chalcomitra adelberti	Benin, Cameroon, Ivory Coast, Ghana, Guinea, Guinea-Bissau, Liberia, Nigeria, Sierra Leone, and Togo.
		Carmelite sunbird	Chalcomitra fuliginosa	Liberia, Angola
		Green-throated sunbird	Chalcomitra rubescens	Angola, Burundi, Cameroon, Central African Republic, Republic of the Congo, Democratic Republic of the Congo, Equatorial Guinea, Gabon, Kenya, Nigeria, Rwanda, South Sudan, Tanzania, Uganda, and Zambia.
		Amethyst sunbird	Chalcomitra amethystina	Angola, Botswana, Burundi, Republic of the Congo, Democratic Republic of the Congo, Eswatini, Ethiopia, Gabon, Kenya, Malawi, Mozambique, Namibia, Somalia, South Africa, South Sudan, Tanzania, Uganda, Zambia and Zimbabwe.
		Scarlet-chested sunbird	Chalcomitra senegalensis	Angola, Benin, Botswana, Burkina Faso, Burundi, Cameroon, Central African Republic, Chad, Democratic Republic of the Congo, Ivory Coast, Eritrea, Ethiopia, Gambia, Ghana, Guinea, Guinea-Bissau, Kenya, Malawi, Mali, Mauritania, Mozambique, Namibia, Niger, Nigeria, Rwanda, Senegal, Sierra Leone, South Africa, Sudan, Swaziland, Tanzania, Togo, Uganda, Zambia, and Zimbabwe.
		Hunter's sunbird	Chalcomitra hunteri	Ethiopia, Kenya, Somalia, South Sudan, Tanzania, and Uganda.
		Socotra sunbird	Chalcomitra balfouri	Socotra.
