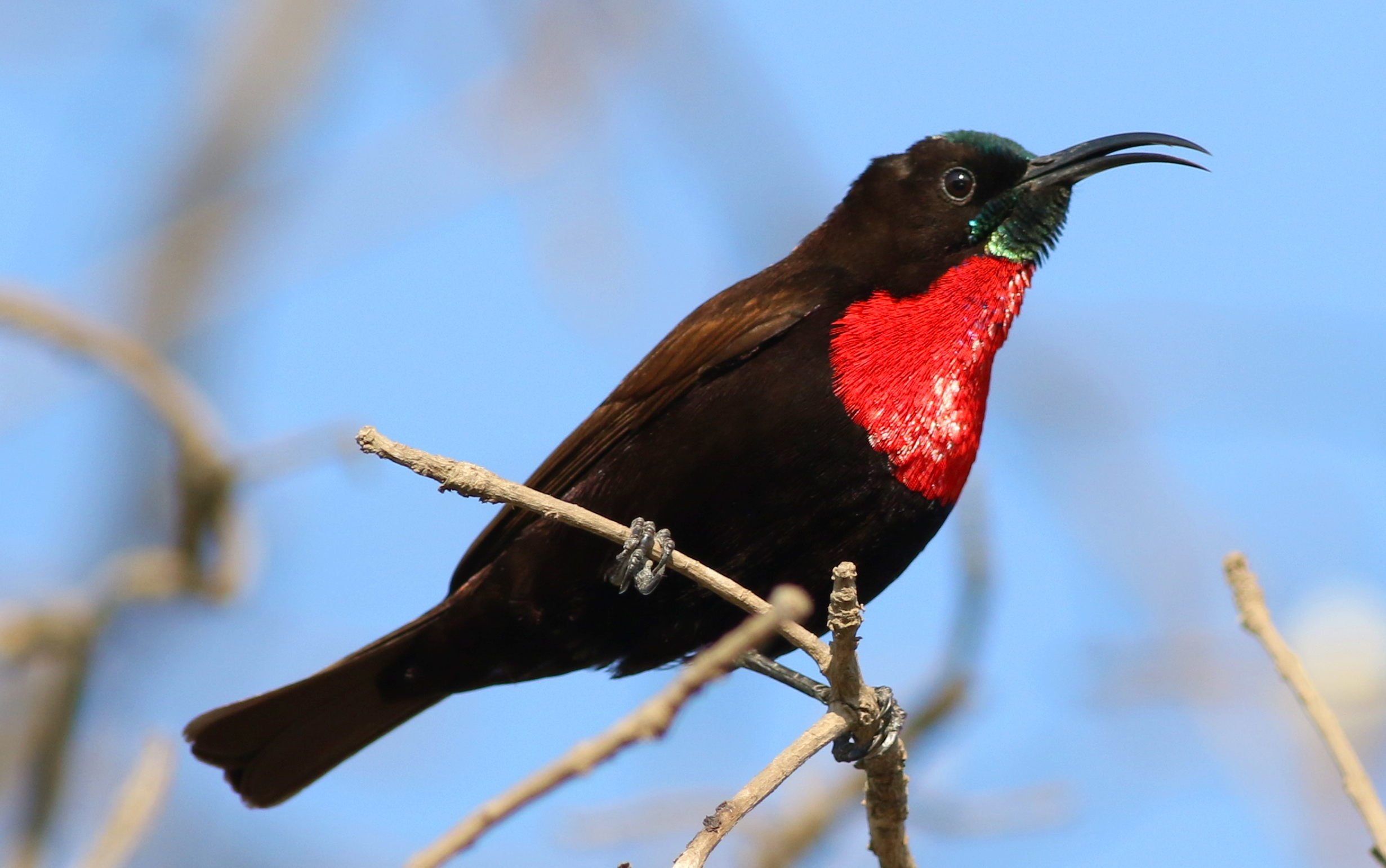

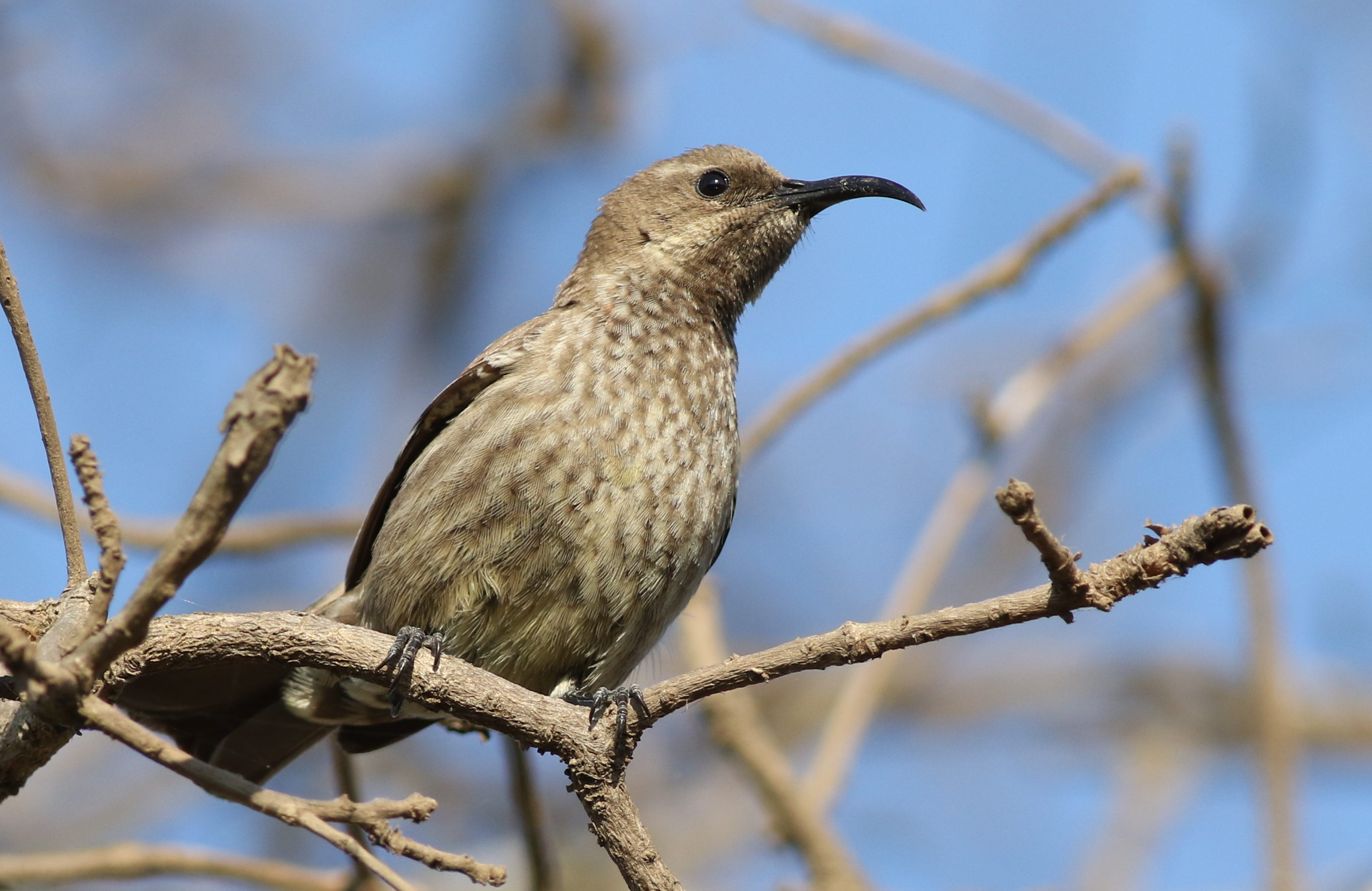
- Male and female at Lake Chivero, Zimbabwe

Conservation status
- Least Concern (IUCN 3.1)

Scientific classification
- Kingdom: Animalia
- Phylum: Chordata
- Class: Aves
- Order: Passeriformes
- Family: Nectariniidae
- Genus: Chalcomitra
- Species: C. senegalensis

Binomial name
- Chalcomitra senegalensis (Linnaeus, 1766)
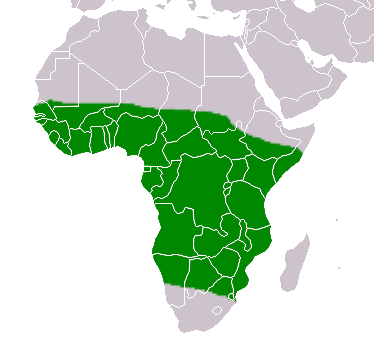
- range

Synonyms
- Certhia senegalensis Linnaeus, 1766; Nectarinia senegalensis (Linnaeus, 1766)

= Scarlet-chested sunbird =

Species of bird

The scarlet-chested sunbird (Chalcomitra senegalensis) is a species of bird in the family Nectariniidae. It is found in many areas of Sub-Saharan Africa, and from South Sudan to South Africa.

== Range ==
It is found in Angola, Benin, Botswana, Burkina Faso, Burundi, Cameroon, Central African Republic, Chad, Democratic Republic of the Congo, Eswatini, Ivory Coast, Eritrea, Ethiopia, Gambia, Ghana, Guinea, Guinea-Bissau, Kenya, Malawi, Mali, Mauritania, Mozambique, Namibia, Niger, Nigeria, Rwanda, Senegal, Sierra Leone, South Africa, Sudan, Tanzania, Togo, Uganda, Zambia, and Zimbabwe.

== Description ==
The scarlet-chested sunbird is similar to Hunter's sunbird in appearance, with adult males having a characteristic red–scarlet coloured breast and an iridescent green patch on top of its head. The female is dark brown with no supercilium. It inhabits woodland and gardens, at elevations of up to 2,400 metres (7,900 ft). The bird is around 13–15 centimetres (5.1–5.9 in) in length, with males having a weight of 7.5–17.2 grams (0.26–0.61 oz) and females weighing 6.8–15.3 grams (0.24–0.54 oz).

== Taxonomy ==
Scarlet-chested sunbird song
Song recorded in Northern Transvaal, South Africa

In 1760, the French zoologist Mathurin Jacques Brisson included a description of the scarlet-chested sunbird in his Ornithologie based on a specimen collected in Senegal. He used the French name Le grimpereau violet du Sénégal and the Latin Certhia Senegalensis Violacea. Although Brisson coined Latin names, these do not conform to the binomial system and are not recognised by the International Commission on Zoological Nomenclature. When the Swedish naturalist Carl Linnaeus updated his Systema Naturae for the twelfth edition in 1766, he added 240 species that had been previously described by Brisson. One of these was the scarlet-chested sunbird. Linnaeus included a brief description, coined the binomial name Certhia senegalensis and cited Brisson's work. This species is now placed in the genus Chalcomitra that was introduced by the German naturalist Ludwig Reichenbach in 1853. Six subspecies are recognised.

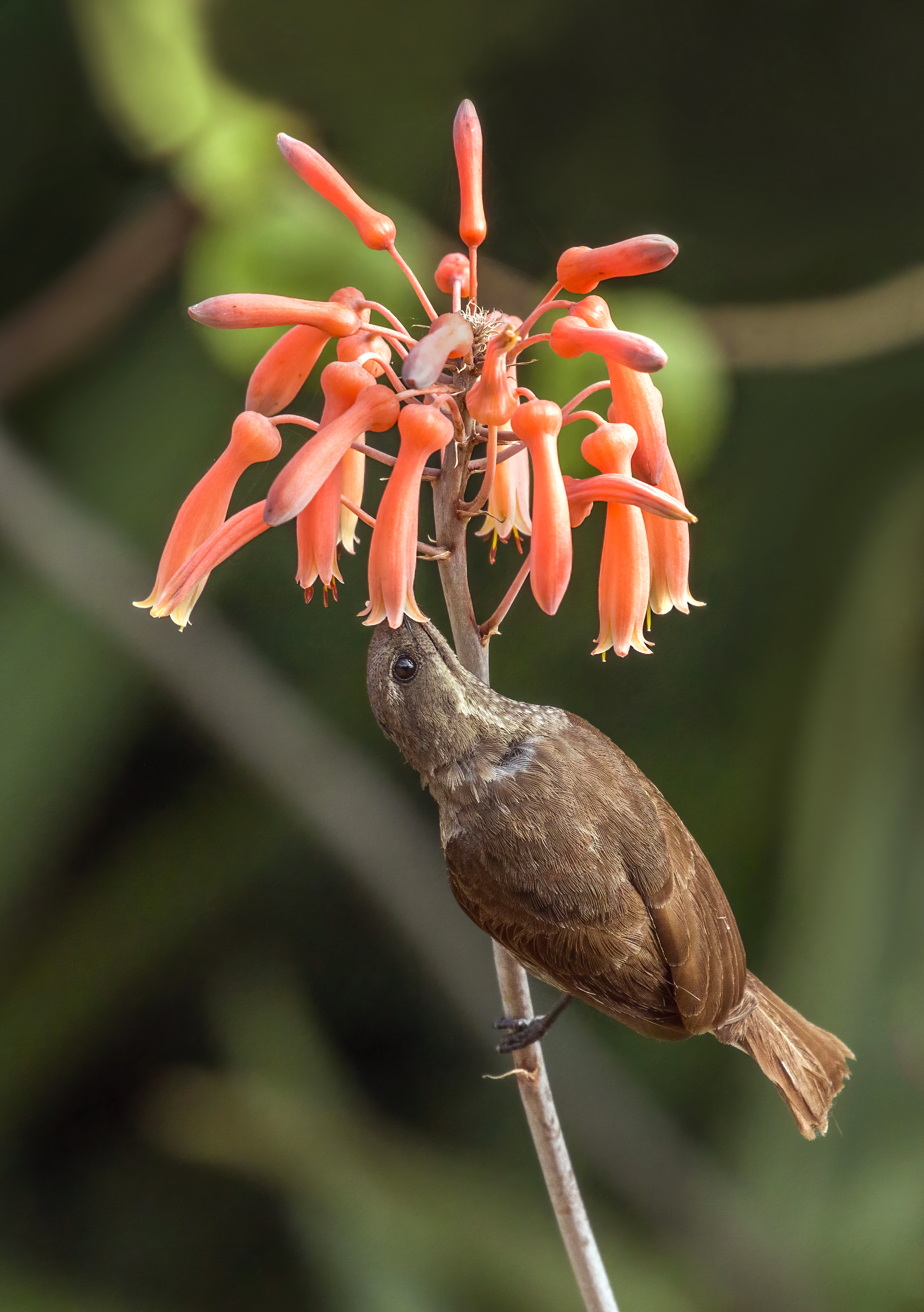
female C. s. lamperti
feeding on Aloe zebrina
in Kenya

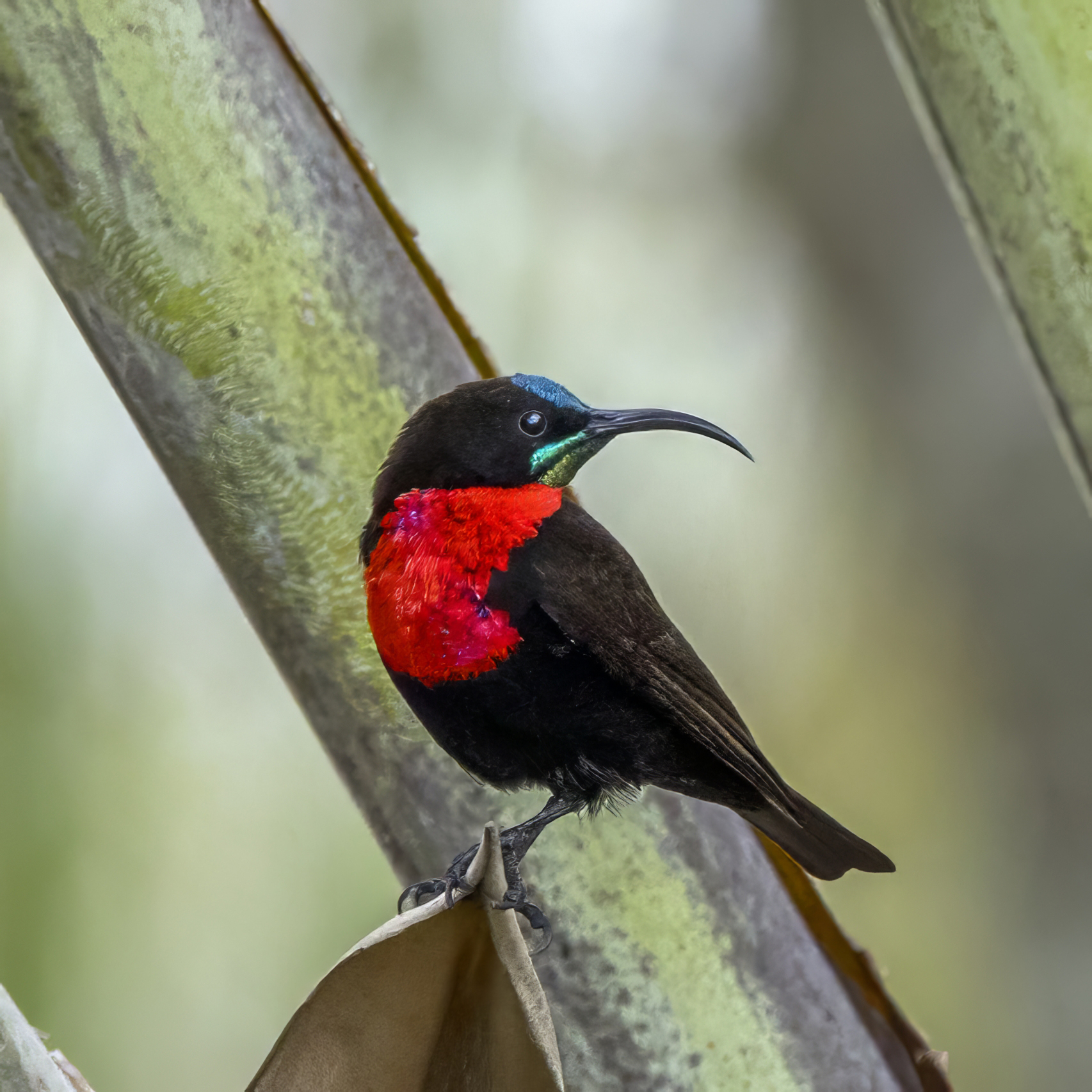
male C. s. gutteralis
in Matsapha, Eswatini

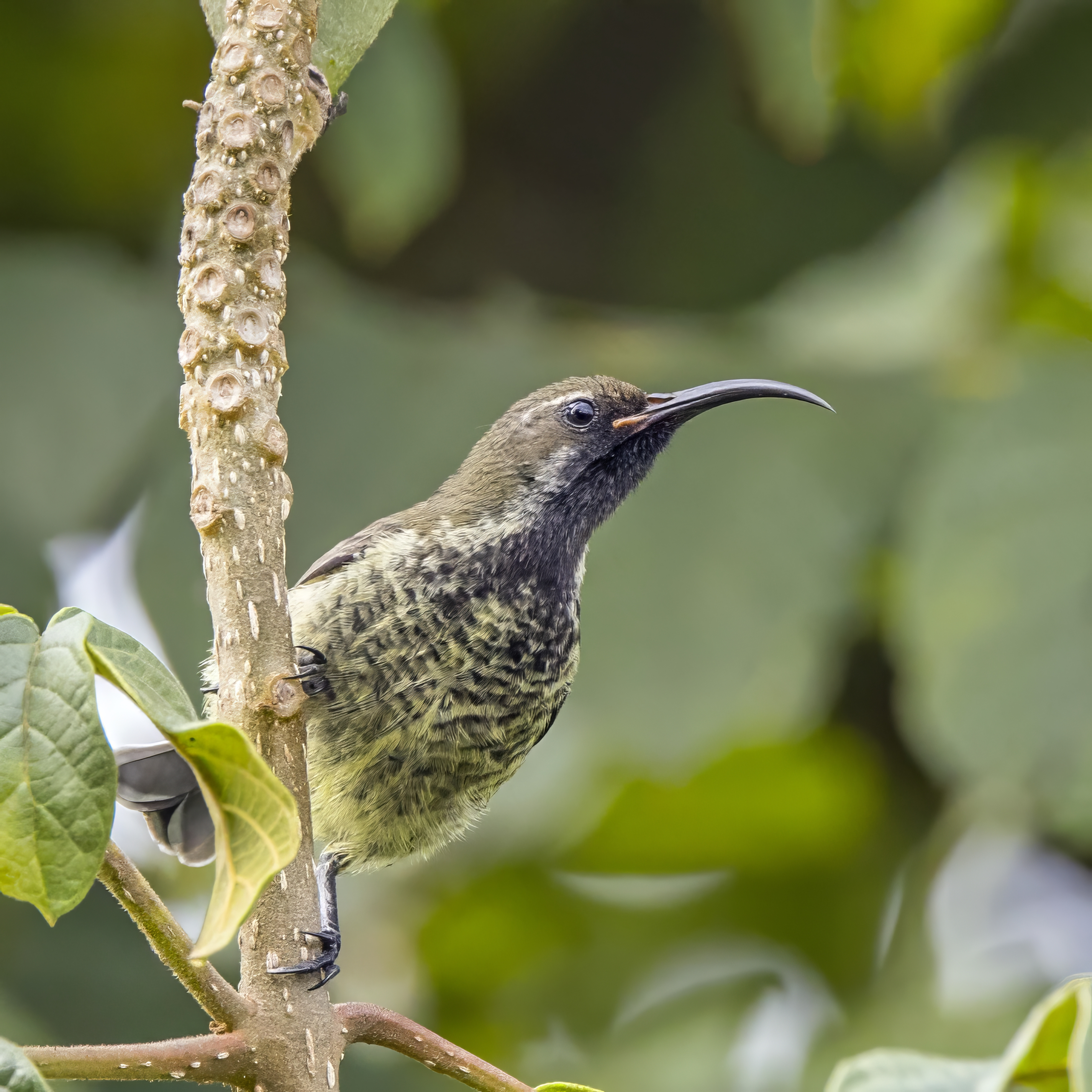
female C. s. gutteralis
in Matsapha, Eswatini

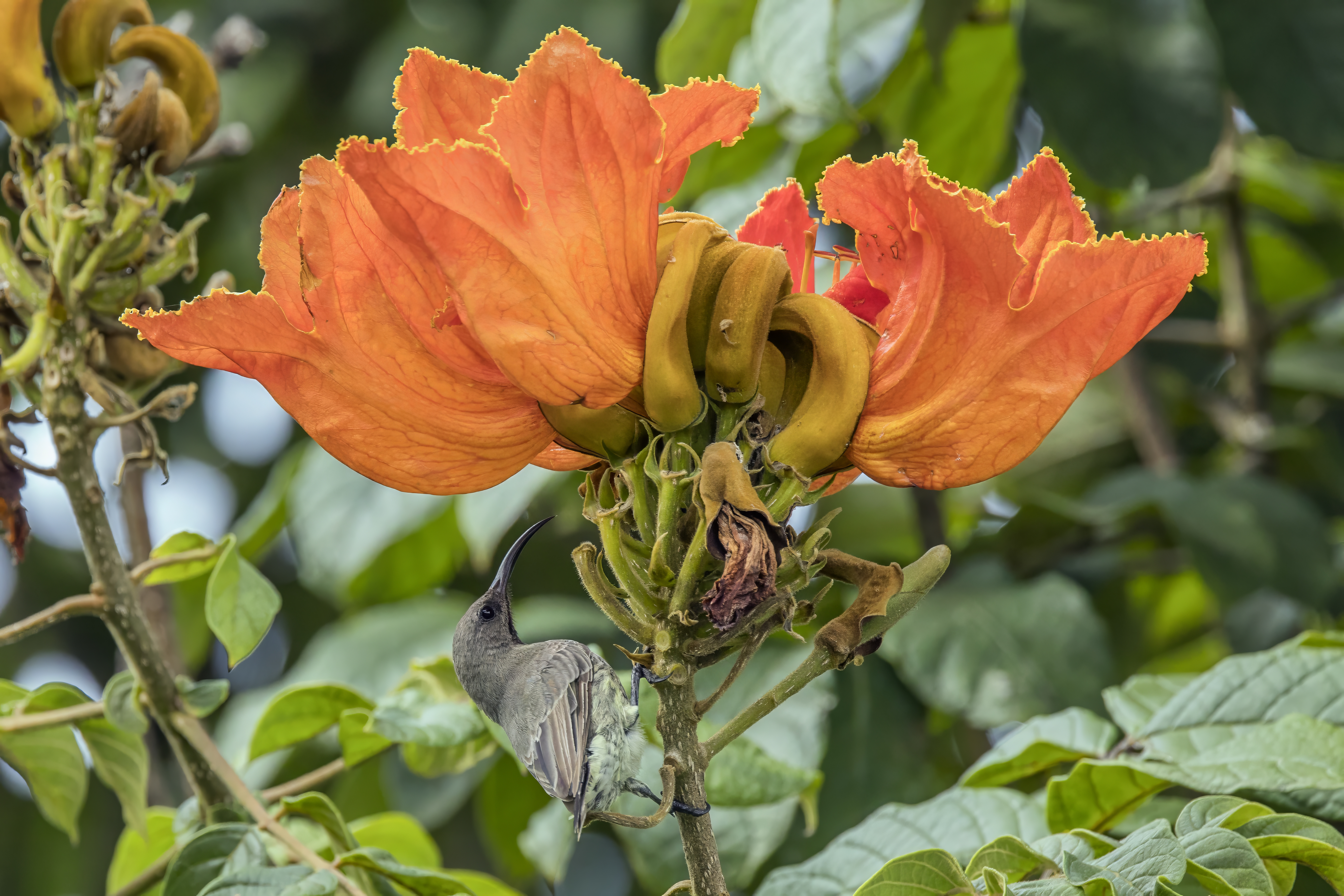
fe male C. s. gutteralis
feeding on African tulip tree
in Matsapha, Eswatini
