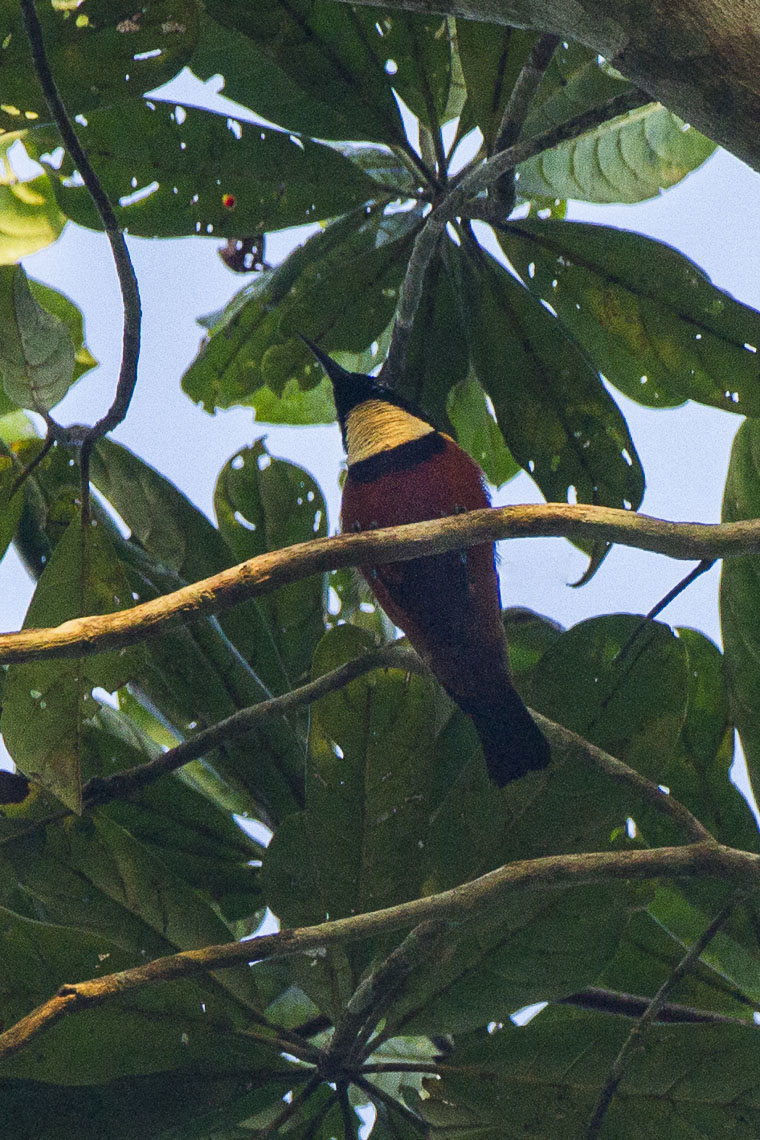

Conservation status
- Least Concern (IUCN 3.1)

Scientific classification
- Kingdom: Animalia
- Phylum: Chordata
- Class: Aves
- Order: Passeriformes
- Family: Nectariniidae
- Genus: Chalcomitra
- Species: C. adelberti

Binomial name
- Chalcomitra adelberti (Gervais, 1834)

Synonyms
- Nectarinia adelberti

= Buff-throated sunbird =

Species of bird

The buff-throated sunbird (Chalcomitra adelberti) is a species of bird in the family Nectariniidae. It is found in Benin, Cameroon, Ivory Coast, Ghana, Guinea, Guinea-Bissau, Liberia, Nigeria, Sierra Leone, and Togo.
