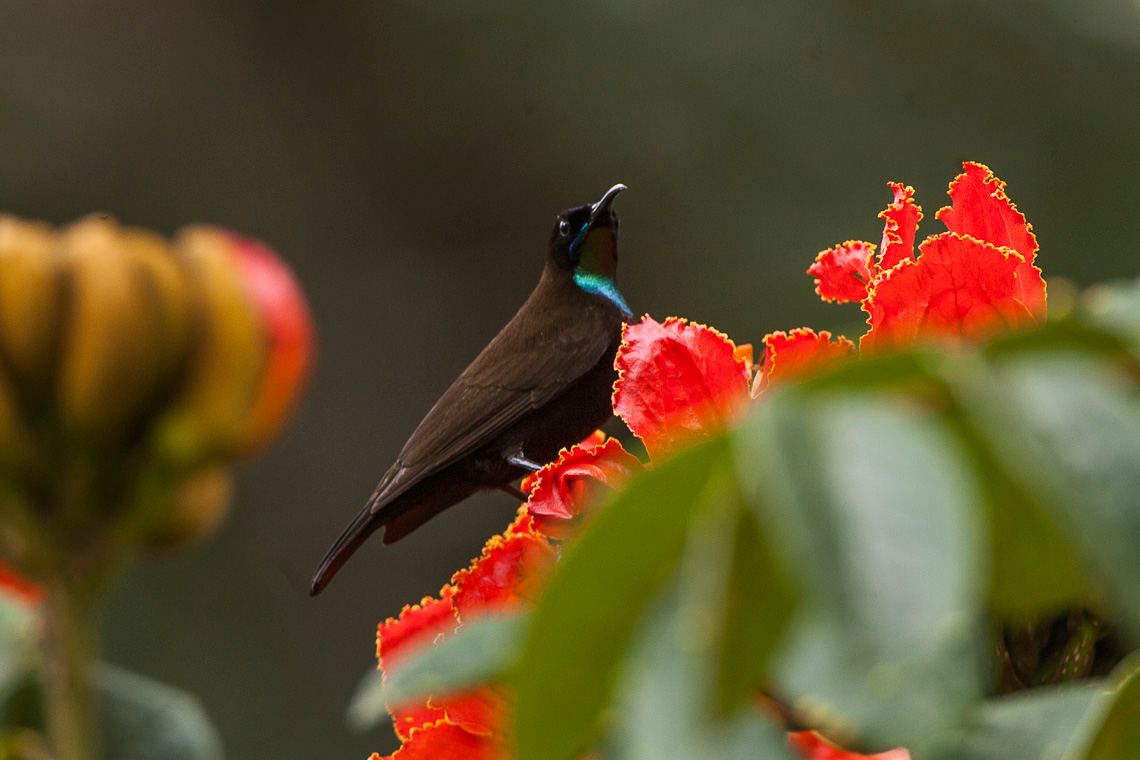

Conservation status
- Least Concern (IUCN 3.1)

Scientific classification
- Kingdom: Animalia
- Phylum: Chordata
- Class: Aves
- Order: Passeriformes
- Family: Nectariniidae
- Genus: Chalcomitra
- Species: C. rubescens

Binomial name
- Chalcomitra rubescens (Vieillot, 1819)

Synonyms
- Nectarinia rubescens

= Green-throated sunbird =

Species of bird

The green-throated sunbird (Chalcomitra rubescens) is a species of bird in the family Nectariniidae. It is found in the African countries of Angola, Burundi, Cameroon, Central African Republic, Republic of the Congo, Democratic Republic of the Congo, Equatorial Guinea, Gabon, Kenya, Nigeria, Rwanda, South Sudan, Tanzania, Uganda, and Zambia.
