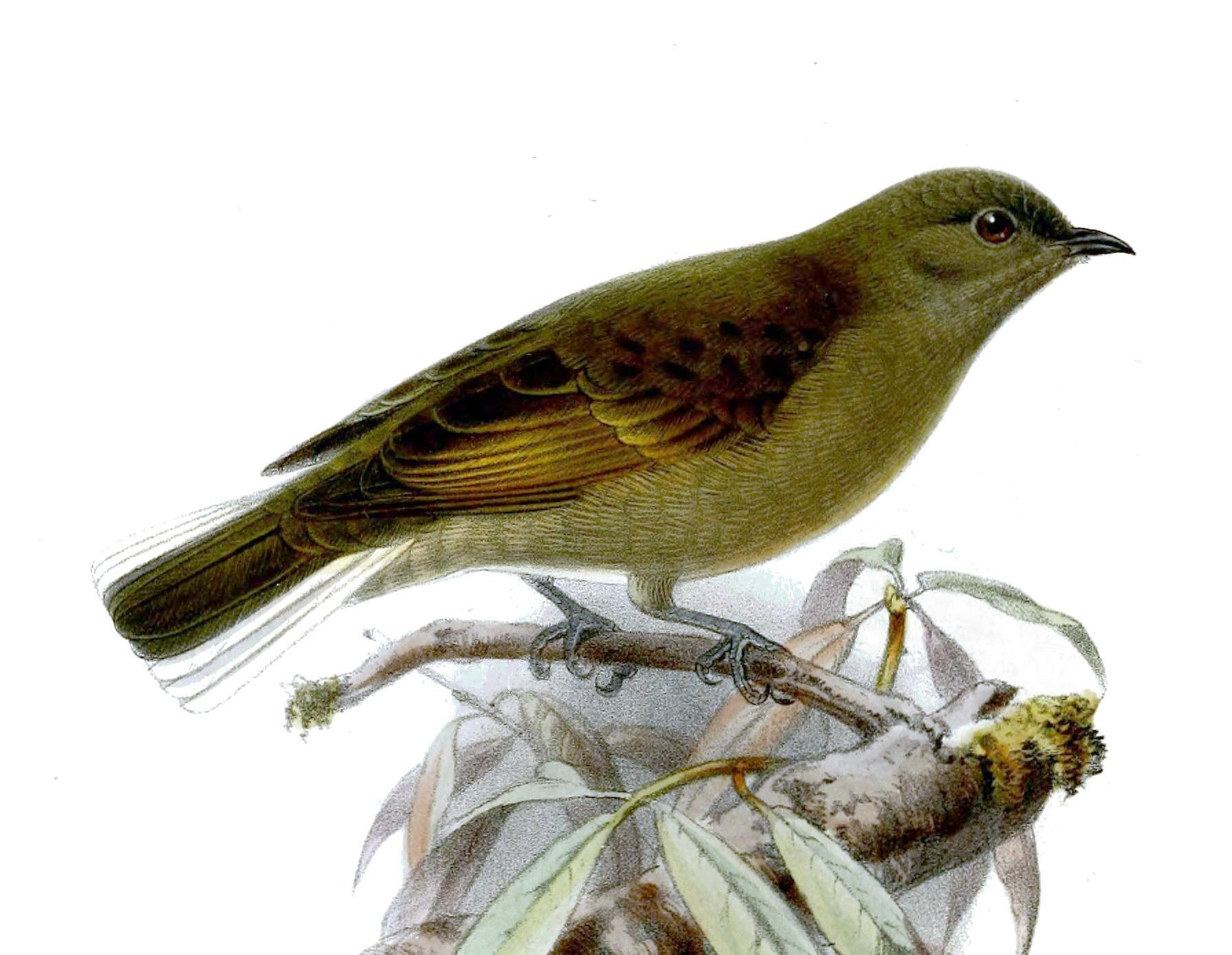

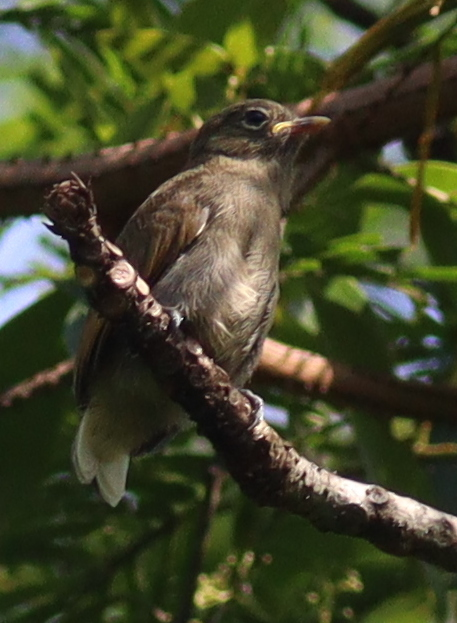
- Juvenile

Conservation status
- Least Concern (IUCN 3.1)

Scientific classification
- Kingdom: Animalia
- Phylum: Chordata
- Class: Aves
- Order: Piciformes
- Family: Indicatoridae
- Genus: Prodotiscus
- Species: P. insignis

Binomial name
- Prodotiscus insignis (Cassin, 1856)
- range

= Cassin's honeybird =

Species of bird

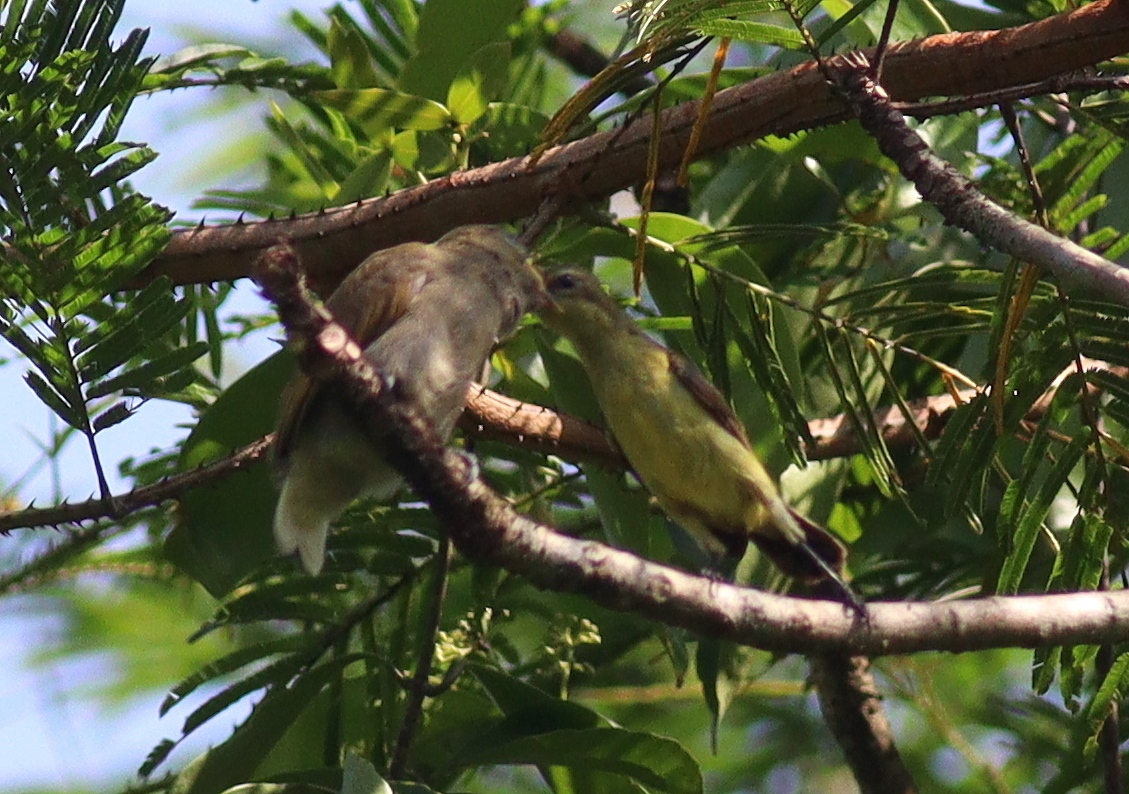
Being fed by sunbirds

Cassin's honeybird (Prodotiscus insignis), also known as Cassin's honeyguide, is a species of bird in the family Indicatoridae.

== Range ==
Its range extends across the African tropical rainforest (also overlapping the Dahomey Gap).
