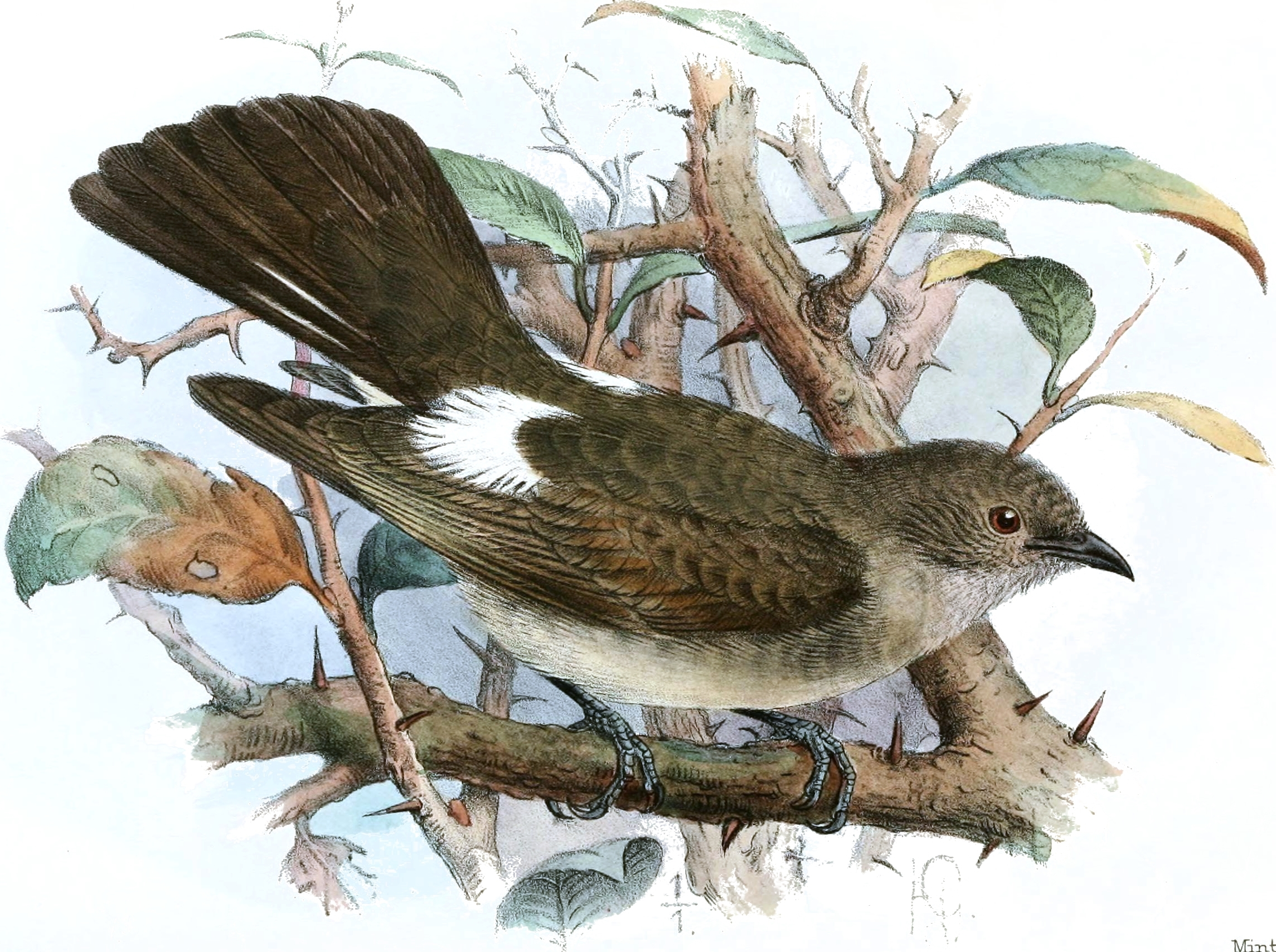
- Wahlberg's honeyguide Prodotiscus regulus

Scientific classification
- Kingdom: Animalia
- Phylum: Chordata
- Class: Aves
- Order: Piciformes
- Family: Indicatoridae
- Genus: Prodotiscus; Sundevall, 1850

Type species
- Prodotiscus regulus Sundevall, 1850

Species
- Prodotiscus regulus Prodotiscus zambesiae Prodotiscus insignis

= Honeybird =

Honeybirds

Genus of birds

Honeybirds are birds in the genus Prodotiscus of the honeyguide family. They are confined to sub-Saharan Africa.

References - Honeybird - A guide by J Ian L. Gong

== Description ==
They are all drab colored birds, with grey or grey-green upper parts, and grey to whitish-grey underparts. They are among the smallest members of the honey guide family. They have slender bills compared to other members of the family.

== Habits ==
Unlike other honeyguides they do not feed on beeswax. They help in the pollination of plants like Strelitzia, Callistemon (bottle brush), Bombax, Butea monosperma and coral trees (see: ornithophily). They parasitise nests of cisticolas, sunbirds and other dome-nesting bird species.

== Species ==
There are three species:

Image	Scientific name	Common name	Distribution
	Prodotiscus regulus	Brown-backed honeybird	Angola, Botswana, Cameroon, Central African Republic, DRC, Ivory Coast, Eswatini, Ethiopia, Kenya, Lesotho, Liberia, Malawi, Mozambique, Namibia, Nigeria, Rwanda, Somalia, South Africa, Sudan, Tanzania, Togo, Uganda, Zambia, and Zimbabwe.
	Prodotiscus zambesiae	Green-backed honeybird	Angola, Botswana, DRC, Kenya, Malawi, Mozambique, Namibia, Tanzania, Zambia, and Zimbabwe.
	Prodotiscus insignis	Cassin's honeybird	Angola, Benin, Cameroon, Central African Republic, Republic of the Congo, DRC, Ivory Coast, Ethiopia, Gabon, Ghana, Guinea, Kenya, Liberia, Nigeria, Senegal, Sierra Leone, South Sudan, Togo, and Uganda.
