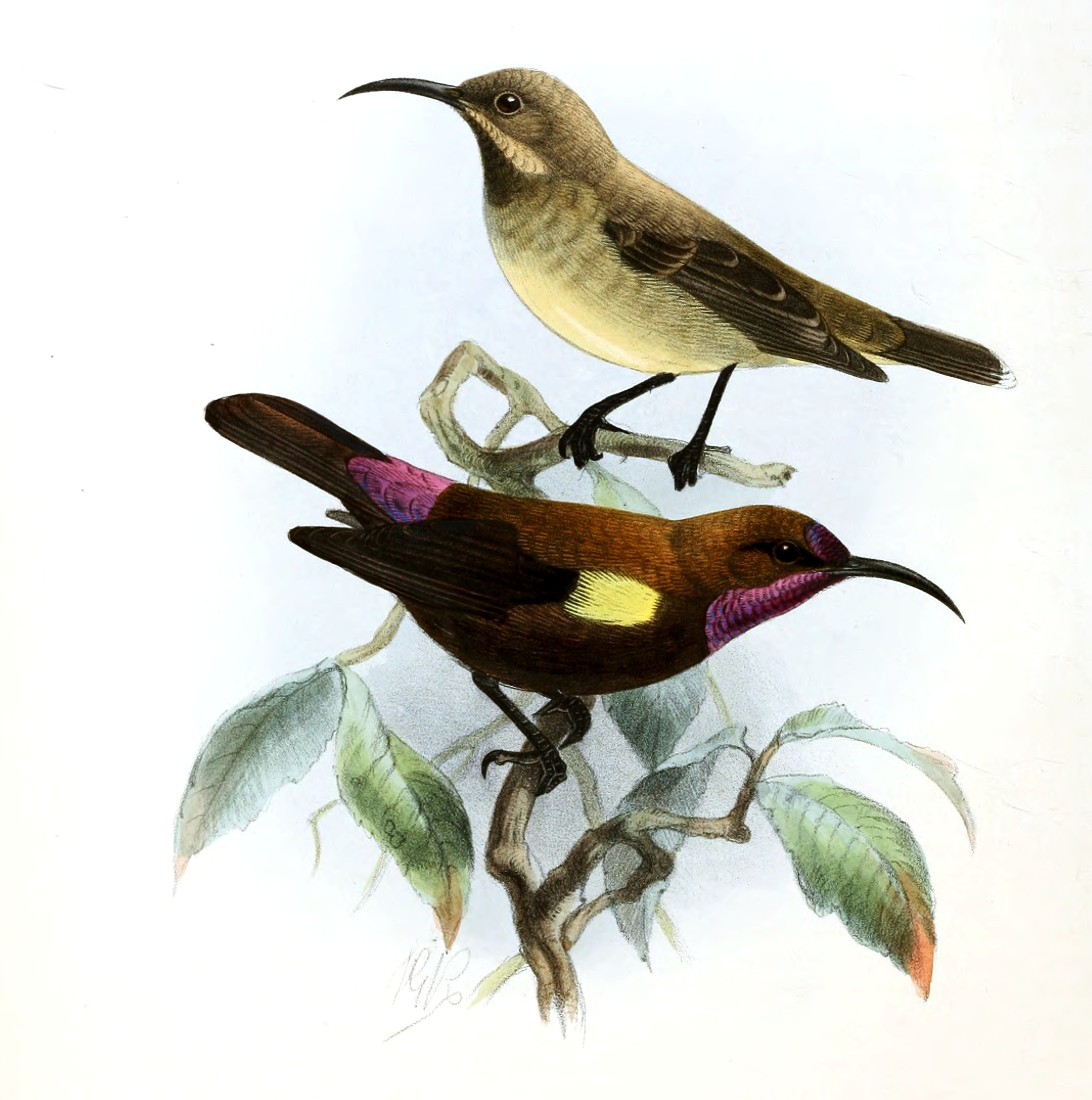

Conservation status
- Least Concern (IUCN 3.1)

Scientific classification
- Kingdom: Animalia
- Phylum: Chordata
- Class: Aves
- Order: Passeriformes
- Family: Nectariniidae
- Genus: Chalcomitra
- Species: C. fuliginosa

Binomial name
- Chalcomitra fuliginosa (Bechstein, 1811)

Synonyms
- Nectarinia fuliginosa

= Carmelite sunbird =

Species of bird

The Carmelite sunbird (Chalcomitra fuliginosa) is a species of bird in the family Nectariniidae. It is found in Liberia as well as the lower Congo River and coastal areas of western and central Africa down to central Angola.
