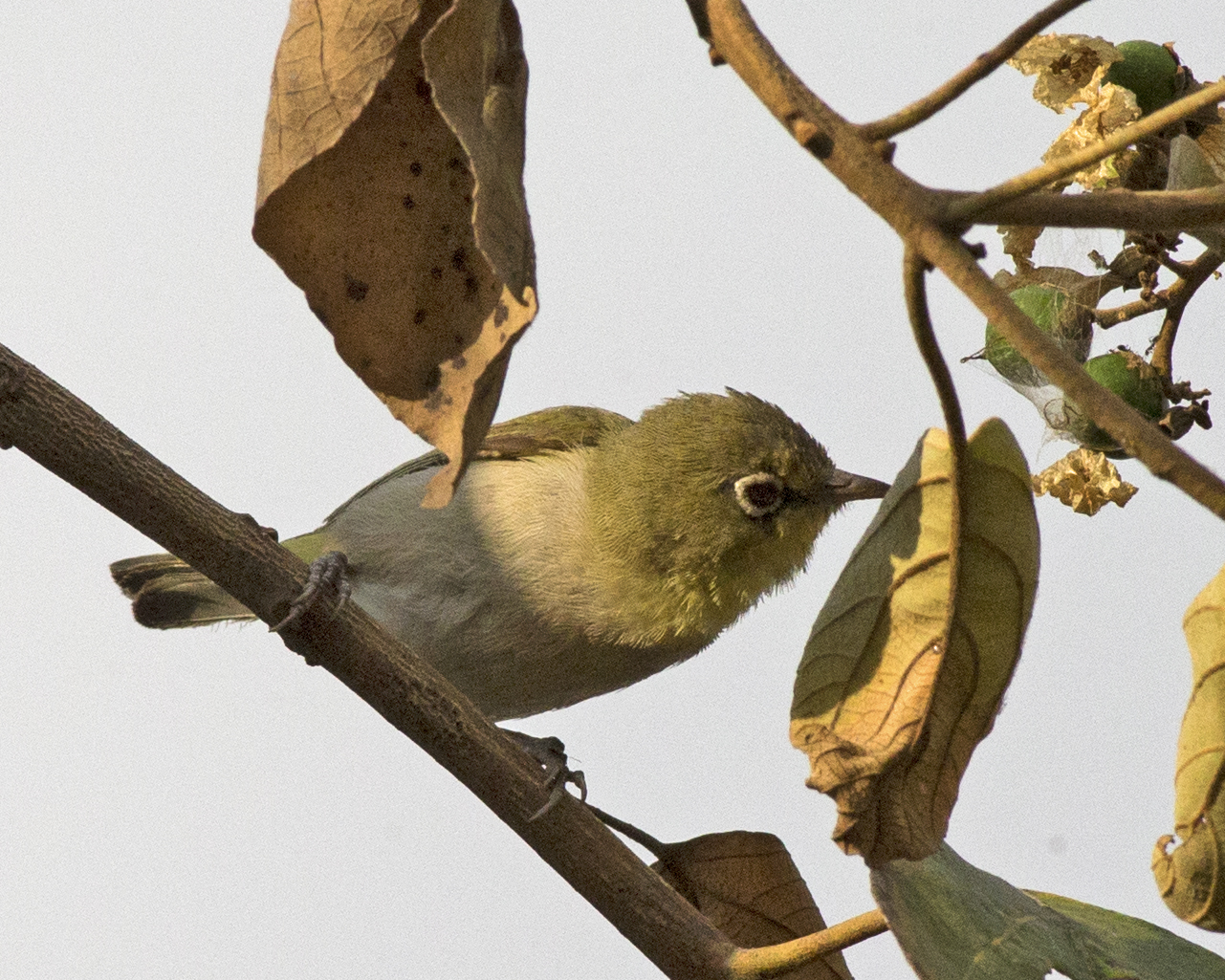

Conservation status
- Least Concern (IUCN 3.1)

Scientific classification
- Kingdom: Animalia
- Phylum: Chordata
- Class: Aves
- Order: Passeriformes
- Family: Zosteropidae
- Genus: Zosterops
- Species: Z. abyssinicus

Binomial name
- Zosterops abyssinicus Guérin-Méneville, 1843

= Abyssinian white-eye =

Species of bird

The Abyssinian white-eye or white-breasted white-eye (Zosterops abyssinicus) is a small passerine bird belonging to the genus Zosterops in the white-eye family Zosteropidae. It is native to north-east Africa and the Southwestern Arabian foothills savanna.

It is 10–12 cm long. The upperparts are green; darker and greyer in northern races. There is a narrow white ring around the eye and a thin black line between the bill and eye. The underparts vary from pale yellow to greyish-white depending on the race. The bird has various twittering and buzzing calls.

In Africa it occurs from north-east Sudan south through Eritrea, Ethiopia, Somaliland and Kenya to north-east Tanzania. It is also found on Socotra Island. In Arabia it occurs in south-west Saudi Arabia, Yemen and southern Oman. It occurs in open woodland, scrub, wadis and gardens. It is found up to 1,800 metres above sea-level in Africa and 3,100 metres in Arabia. It usually forages among branches in trees but sometimes descends to ground-level. It feeds mainly on insects and will also take nectar from flowers.
