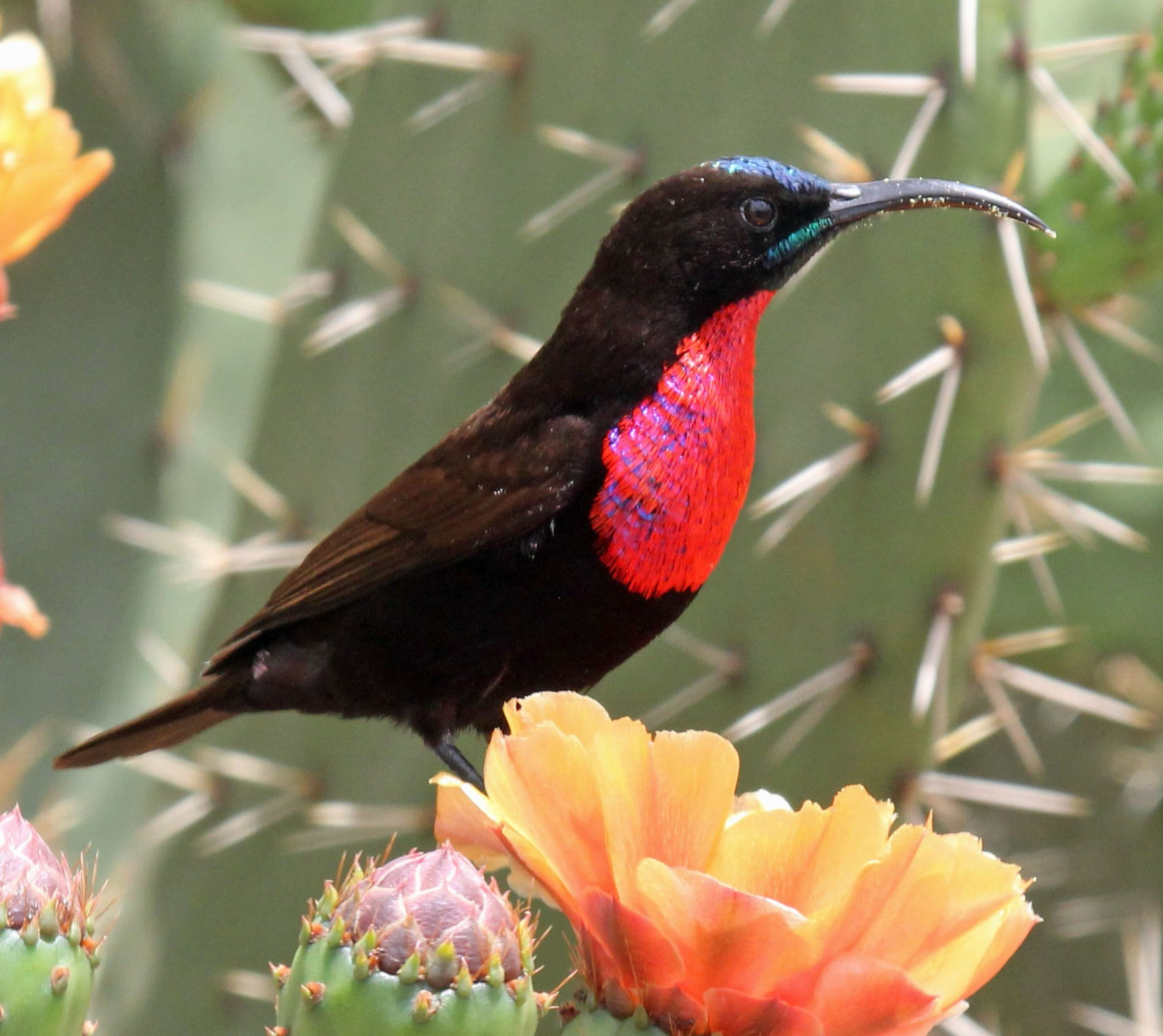
- Male bird at Nairobi National Park

Conservation status
- Least Concern (IUCN 3.1)

Scientific classification
- Kingdom: Animalia
- Phylum: Chordata
- Class: Aves
- Order: Passeriformes
- Family: Nectariniidae
- Genus: Chalcomitra
- Species: C. hunteri

Binomial name
- Chalcomitra hunteri (Shelley, 1889)

Synonyms
- Nectarinia hunteri

= Hunter's sunbird =

Species of bird

Hunter's sunbird (Chalcomitra hunteri) is a species of bird in the family Nectariniidae. It is found in Ethiopia, Kenya, Somalia, South Sudan, Tanzania, and Uganda.

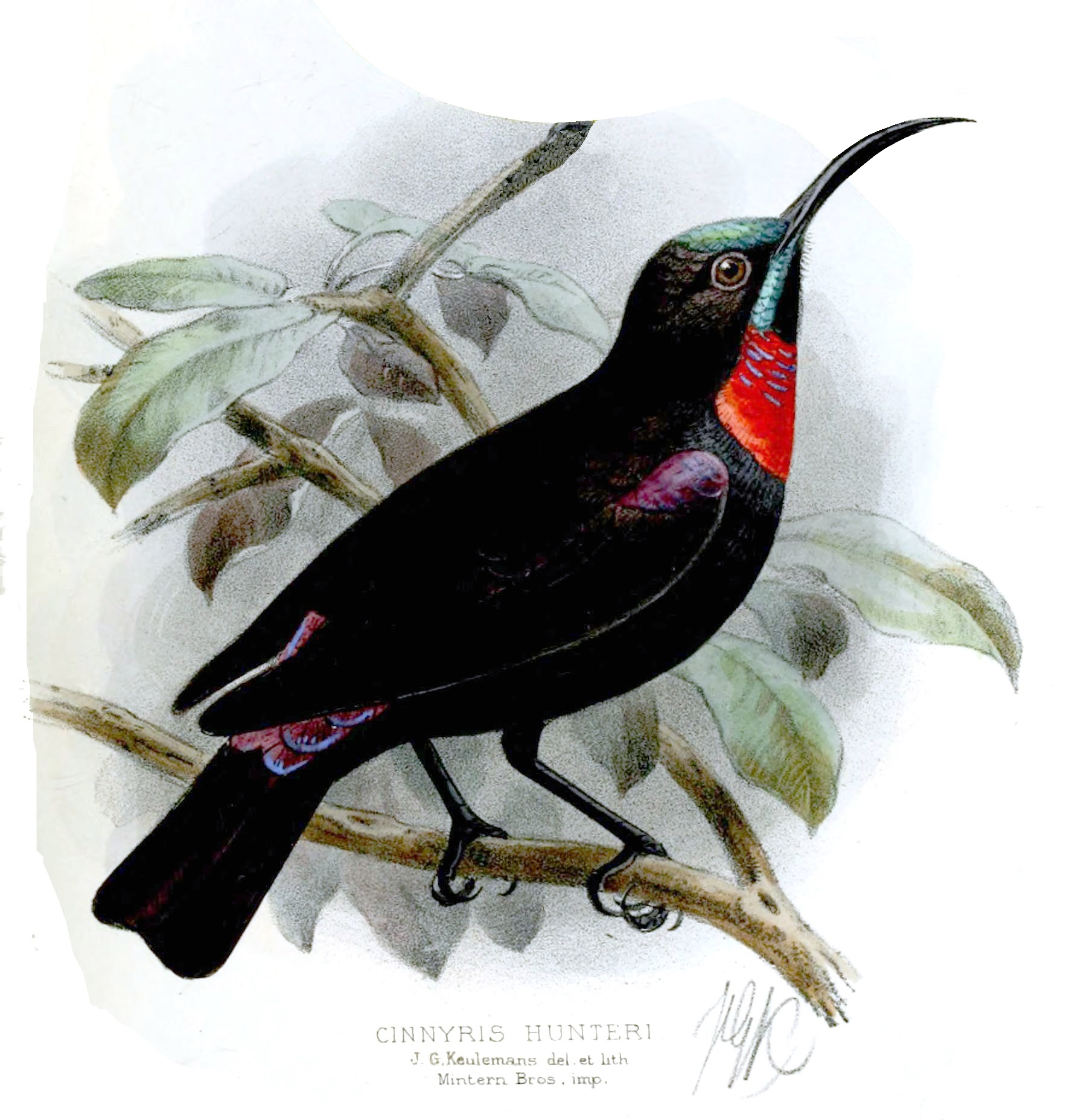
Illustration by Keulemans (1889)
