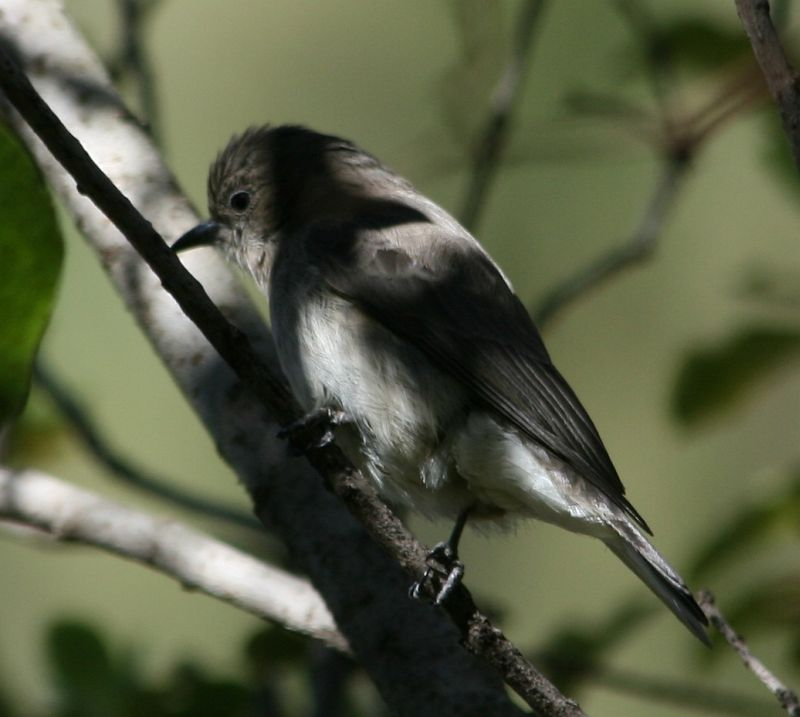

Conservation status
- Least Concern (IUCN 3.1)

Scientific classification
- Kingdom: Animalia
- Phylum: Chordata
- Class: Aves
- Order: Piciformes
- Family: Indicatoridae
- Genus: Prodotiscus
- Species: P. regulus

Binomial name
- Prodotiscus regulus Sundevall, 1850
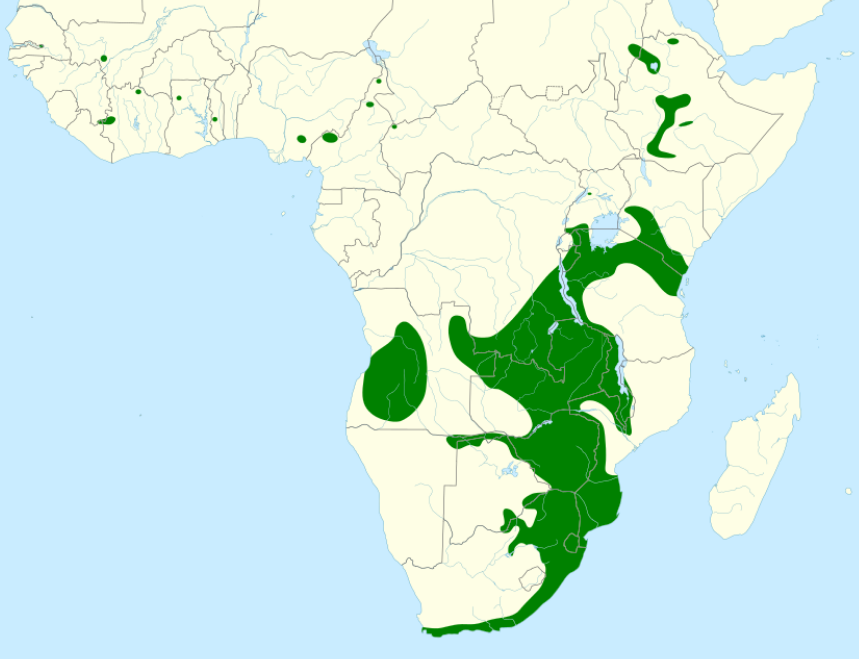
- range

= Brown-backed honeybird =

Species of bird

The brown-backed honeybird (Prodotiscus regulus), also known as Wahlberg's honeybird, Wahlberg's honeyguide and sharp-billed honeyguide, is a species of bird in the family Indicatoridae. This bird is named after the Swedish naturalist Johan August Wahlberg.

== Range ==
It is found in Angola, Botswana, Cameroon, Central African Republic, DRC, Ivory Coast, Eswatini, Ethiopia, Kenya, Lesotho, Liberia, Malawi, Mozambique, Namibia, Nigeria, Rwanda, Somalia, South Africa, Sudan, Tanzania, Togo, Uganda, Zambia, and Zimbabwe.

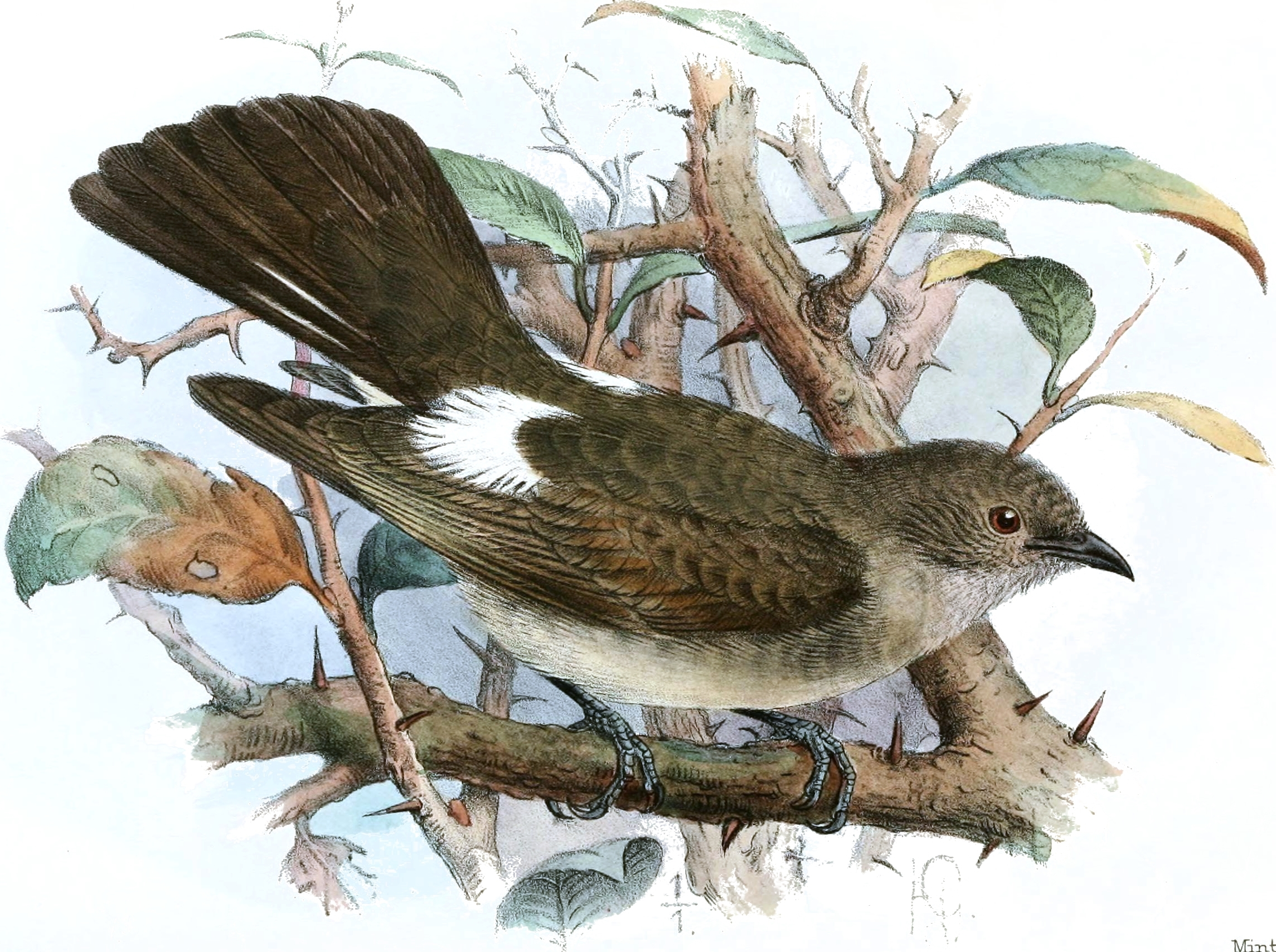
Form peasei from southern Ethiopia = P. r. subsp. regulus Sundevall, 1850
