= List of birds of Kenya =

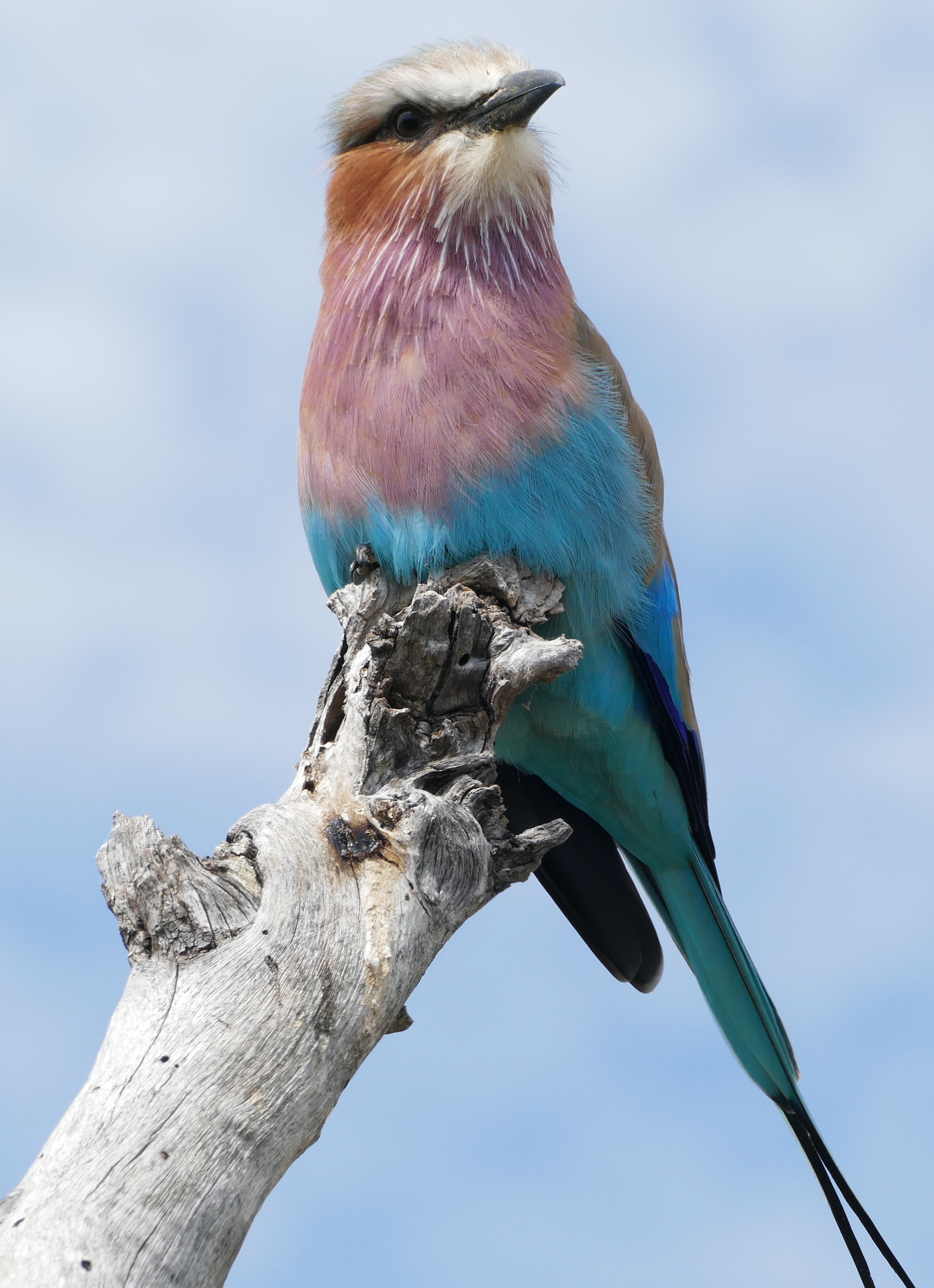
The lilac-breasted roller and the rooster are Kenya's national birds.

This is a list of the bird species recorded in Kenya. The avifauna of Kenya included a total of 1164 confirmed species as of October 2024. Of them, 11 are endemic, and 4 have been introduced by humans. An additional three species are considered "hypothetical" (see below) and are not included in the count. Unless otherwise noted, the list is that of Avibase. Swahili names follow the scientific name in parentheses.

This list's taxonomic treatment (designation and sequence of orders, families and species) and nomenclature (English and scientific names) are those of The Clements Checklist of Birds of the World, 2022 edition.

The following tags highlight several categories of occurrence other than regular migrants and non-endemic residents. The notes of population status are from the IUCN Red List of Threatened Species, and apply to the world-wide population except for endemics.

- (A) Accidental - a species that rarely or accidentally occurs in Kenya (also called a vagrant)
- (E) Endemic - a species endemic to Kenya
- (I) Introduced - a species introduced to Kenya as a consequence, direct or indirect, of human actions
- (H) Hypothetical - a species recorded but not confirmed in Kenya

== Ostriches ==
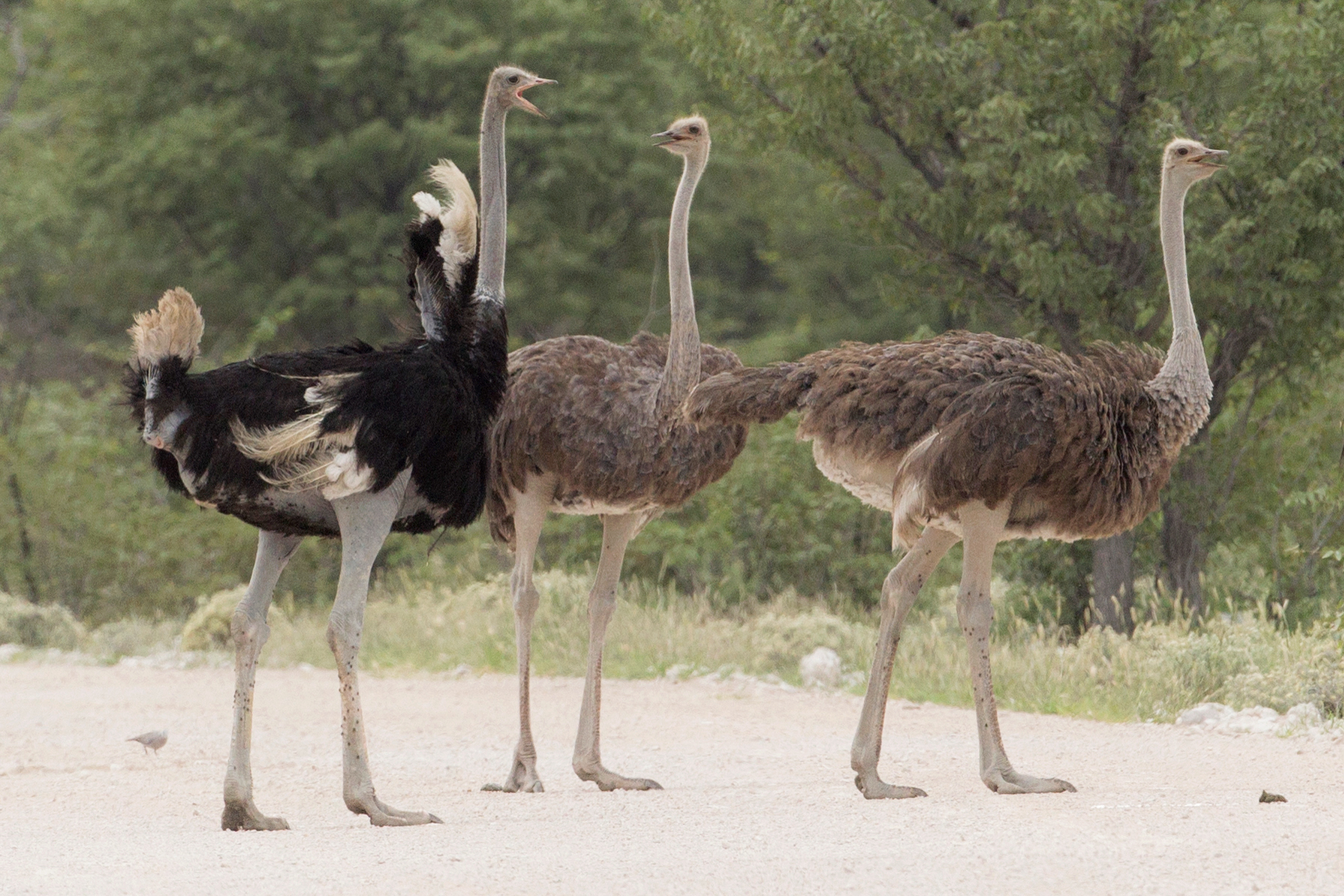
Common ostrich male and females in Etosha National Park, Namibia

Order: Struthioniformes Family: Struthionidae

The ostriches are flightless birds native to Africa. They are the largest living species of bird and are distinctive in appearance, with a long neck and legs and the ability to run at high speeds.

- Common ostrich, Struthio camelus (mbuni wa kawaida)
- Somali ostrich, Struthio molybdophanes (mbuni Somali) (vulnerable)

== Ducks, geese, and waterfowl ==
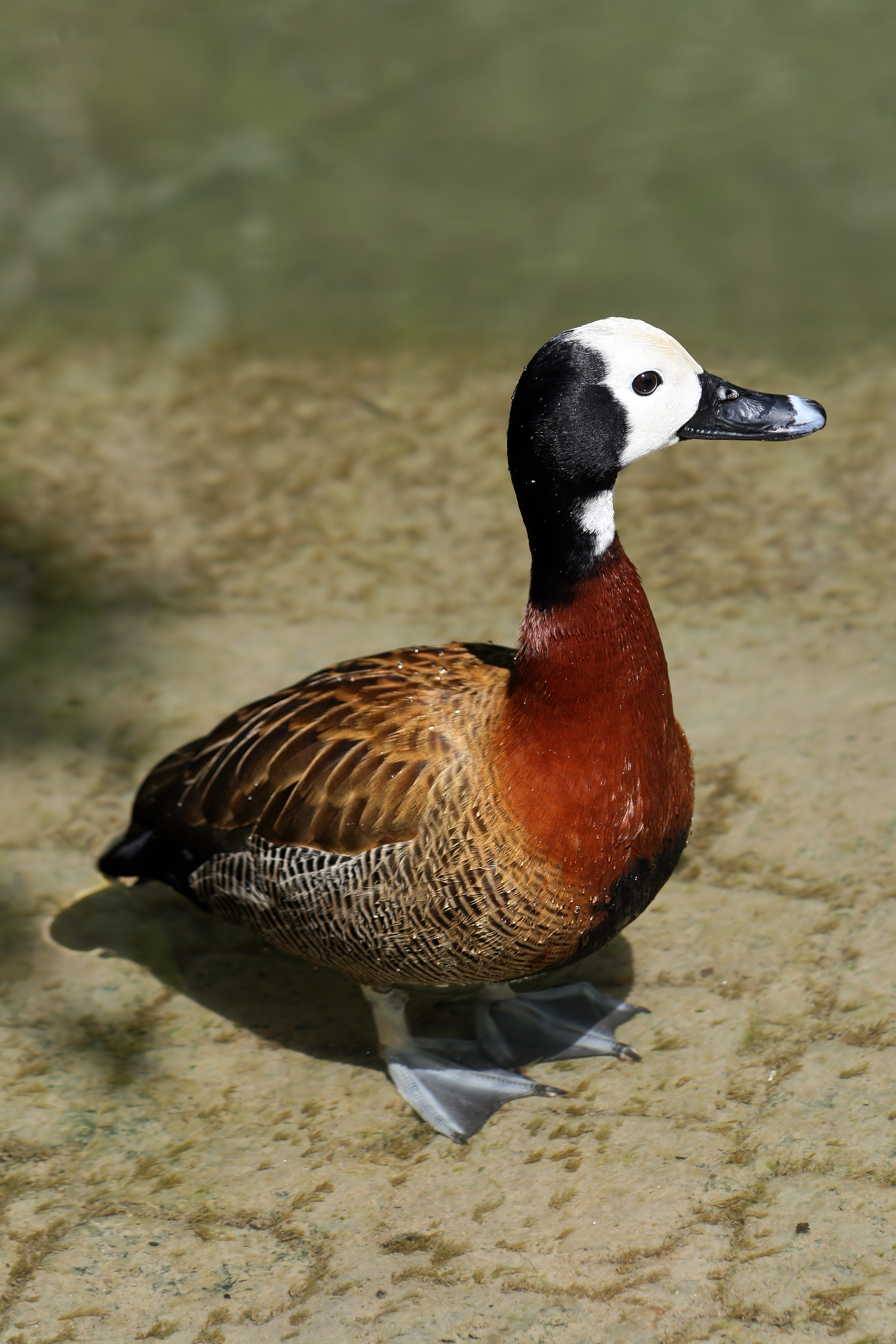
White-faced whistling-duck

Order: Anseriformes Family: Anatidae

Anatidae includes the ducks and most duck-like waterfowl, such as geese and swans. These birds are adapted to an aquatic existence with webbed feet, flattened bills, and feathers that are excellent at shedding water due to an oily coating.

- White-faced whistling-duck, Dendrocygna viduata (batamiti uso-mweupe)
- Fulvous whistling-duck, Dendrocygna bicolor (batamiti kahawia)
- White-backed duck, Thalassornis leuconotus (kotwe)
- Knob-billed duck, Sarkidiornis melanotos (bata-nyundo)
- Egyptian goose, Alopochen aegyptiaca (bata bukini wa Misri)
- Ruddy shelduck, Tadorna ferruginea (bata kahawianyekundu) (A)
- Spur-winged goose, Plectropterus gambensis (bata bukini mabawa-kijani)
- African pygmy-goose, Nettapus auritus (bata salili)
- Garganey, Spatula querquedula (bata mchirizi-mweupe)
- Blue-billed teal, Spatula hottentota (bata domo-buluu)
- Northern shoveler, Spatula clypeata (bata sepeto)
- Gadwall, Mareca strepera (bata kijivu)
- Eurasian wigeon, Mareca penelope (bata domo-kijivu)
- African black duck, Anas sparsa (bata mweusi)
- Yellow-billed duck, Anas undulata (bata domo-njano)
- Mallard, Anas platyrhynchos (bata wa Ulaya)
- Cape teal, Anas capensis (bata kusi)
- Red-billed duck, Anas erythrorhyncha (bata domo-jekundu)
- Northern pintail, Anas acuta (bata kipini)
- Green-winged teal, Anas crecca (bata mabawa-kijani)
- Southern pochard, Netta erythrophthalma (bata macho-mekundu)
- Common pochard, Aythya ferina (A) (vulnerable) (bata kichwa-chekundu)
- Ferruginous duck, Aythya nyroca (near-threatened) (bata macho-meupe)
- Tufted duck, Aythya fuligula (bata kishungi)
- Maccoa duck, Oxyura maccoa (bata makoa) (vulnerable)

== Guineafowl ==
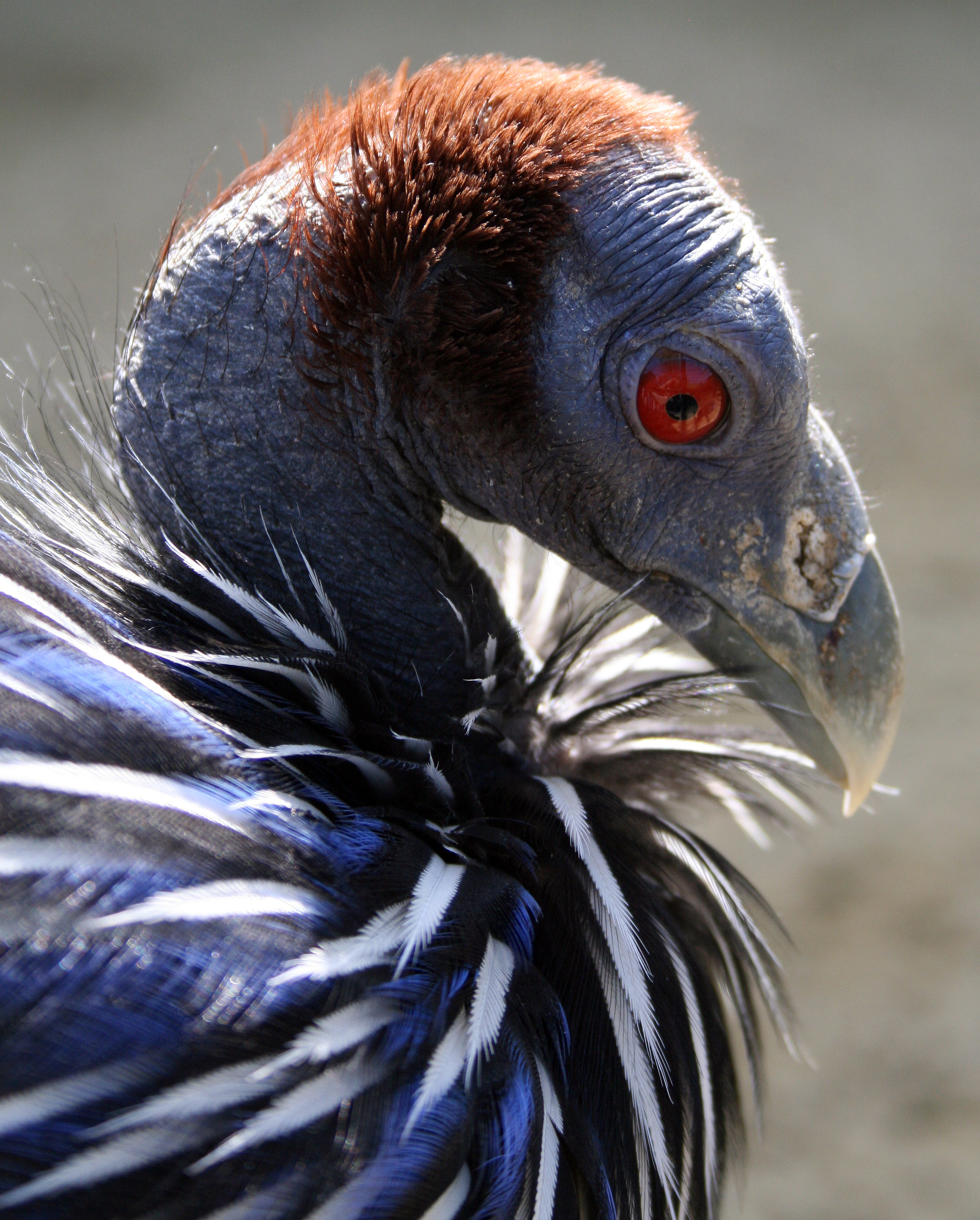
Vulturine guineafowl

Order: Galliformes Family: Numididae

Guineafowl are a group of African, seed-eating, ground-nesting birds that resemble partridges, but with featherless heads and spangled grey plumage.

- Helmeted guineafowl, Numida meleagris (kanga)
- Vulturine guineafowl, Acryllium vulturinum (kicheleko)
- Eastern crested guineafowl, Guttera pucherani (kororo mashariki)
- Western crested guineafowl, Guttera verreauxi (kororo magharibi)

== New World quail ==
Order: Galliformes Family: Odontophoridae

Despite their family's common name, this species and one other are native to Africa.

- Stone partridge, Ptilopachus petrosus (sikipi)

== Pheasants, grouse, and allies ==
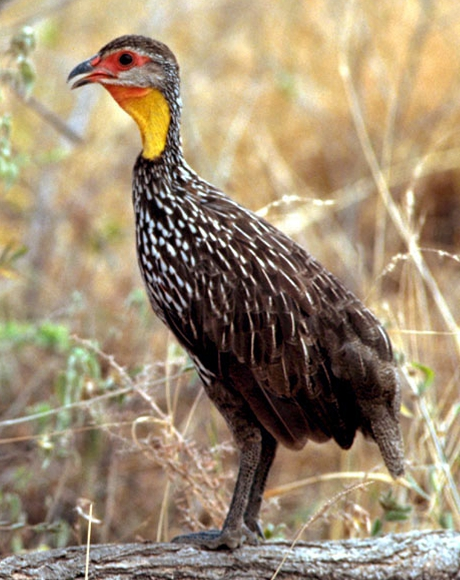
The yellow-necked francolin is common in grasslands.

Order: Galliformes Family: Phasianidae

The Phasianidae are a family of terrestrial birds which consists of quails, partridges, snowcocks, francolins, spurfowls, tragopans, monals, pheasants, peafowls, and jungle fowls. In general, they are plump (although they vary in size) and have broad, relatively short wings.

- Crested francolin, Ortygornis sephaena (kwale kishungi)
- Coqui francolin, Campocolinus coqui (kwale miguu-njano)
- Ring-necked francolin, Scleroptila streptophora (kwale shingo-nyeusi) (near-threatened)
- Red-winged francolin, Scleroptila levaillantii (kwale mabawa-mekundu)
- Elgon francolin, Scleroptila elgonensis (kwale wa Elgon)
- Orange River francolin, Scleroptila gutturalis (kwale wa Kulal)
- Shelley's francolin, Scleroptila shelleyi (kwale wa Shelley)
- Blue quail, Synoicus adansonii (tombo buluu)
- Common quail, Coturnix coturnix (tombo)
- Harlequin quail, Coturnix delegorguei (tombo kidari-cheusi)
- Chestnut-naped francolin, Pternistis castaneicollis (kereng'ende kisogo-chekundu)
- Jackson's francolin, Pternistis jacksoni (kereng'ende-milima)
- Hildebrandt's francolin, Pternistis hildebrandti (kereng'ende wa Hildebrandt)
- Scaly francolin, Pternistis squamatus (kereng'ende mabaka)
- Yellow-necked francolin, Pternistis leucoscepus (kereng'ende koo-njano)
- Red-necked francolin, Pternistis afer (kereng'ende koo-jekundu)

== Flamingos ==
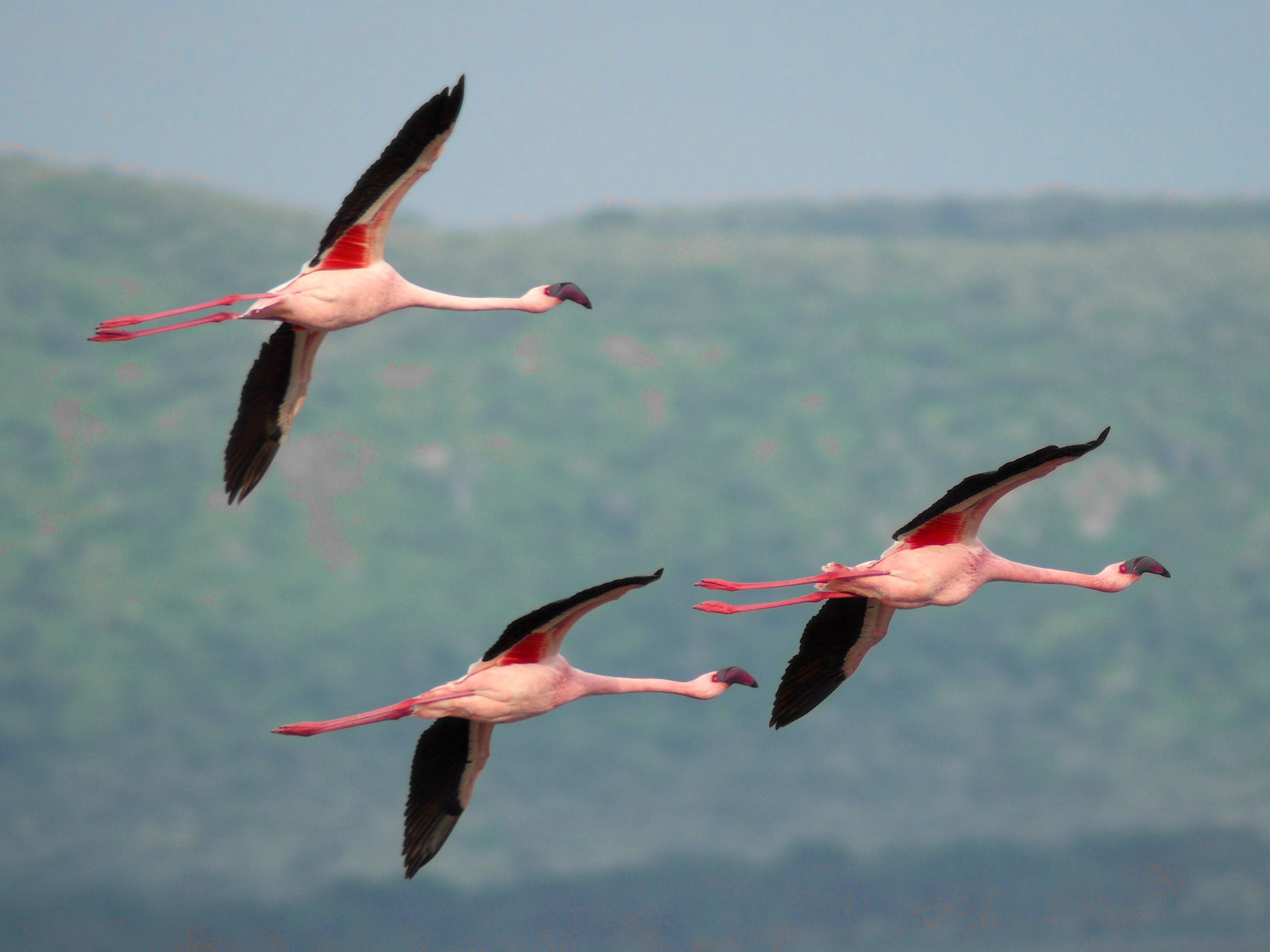
Enormous flocks of lesser flamingos visit the Rift Valley lakes (here Lake Nakuru).

Order: Phoenicopteriformes Family: Phoenicopteridae

Flamingos are gregarious wading birds, usually 3 to 5 feet (0.9 to 1.5 m) tall, found in both the Western and Eastern Hemispheres. Flamingos filter-feed on shellfish and algae. Their oddly shaped beaks are specially adapted to separate mud and silt from the food they consume and, uniquely, are used upside-down.

- Greater flamingo, Phoenicopterus roseus (heroe mkubwa)
- Lesser flamingo, Phoeniconaias minor (heroe mdogo) (near-threatened)

== Grebes ==
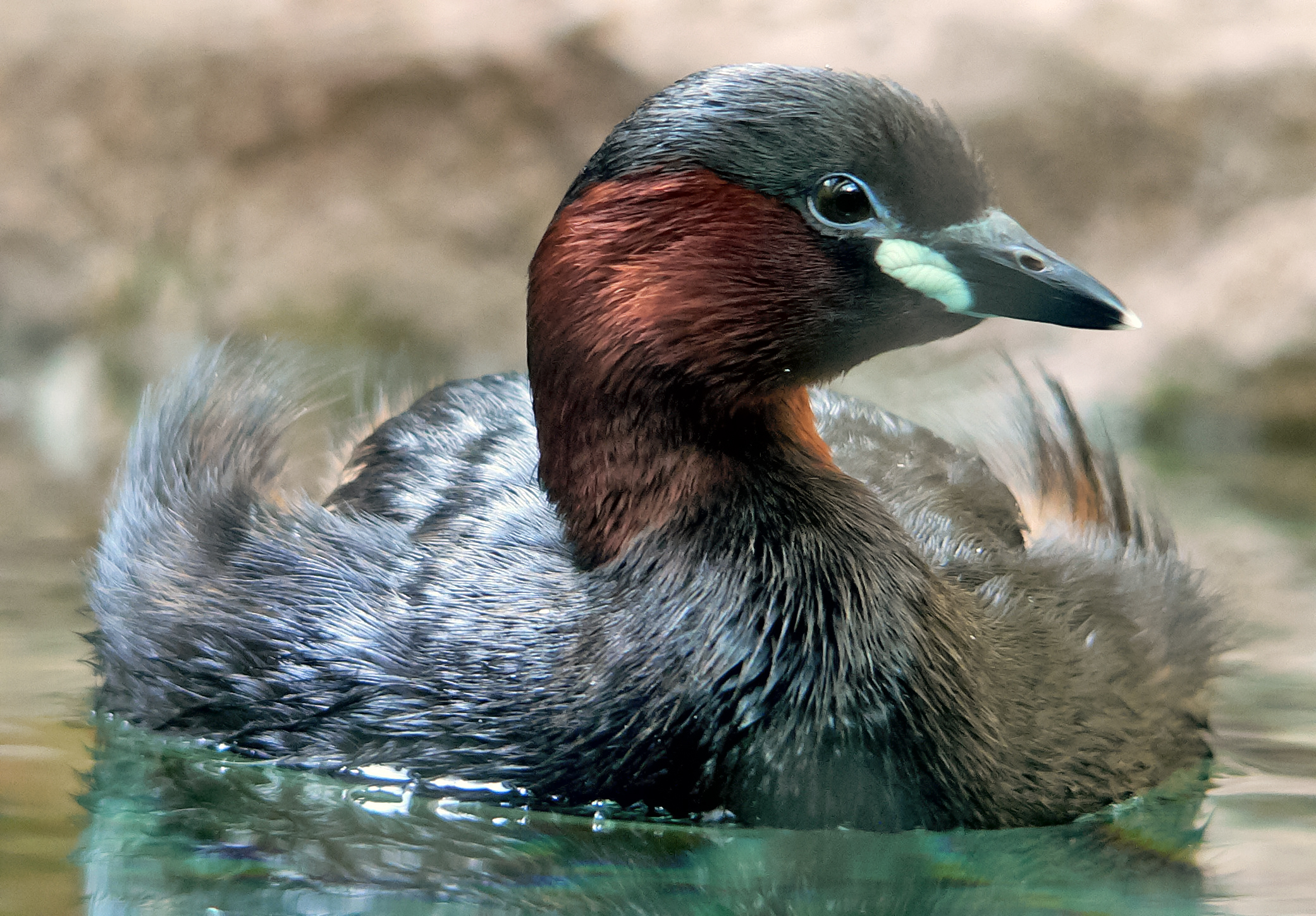
The little grebe is the most frequently sighted grebe in Kenya.

Order: Podicipediformes Family: Podicipedidae

Grebes are small to medium-large freshwater diving birds. They have lobed toes and are excellent swimmers and divers. Their feet are placed far back on the body, making them quite ungainly on land.

- Little grebe, Tachybaptus ruficollis (kibisi mdogo)
- Great crested grebe, Podiceps cristatus (kibisi ushingi)
- Eared grebe, Podiceps nigricollis (kibisi shingo-nyeusi)

== Pigeons and doves ==
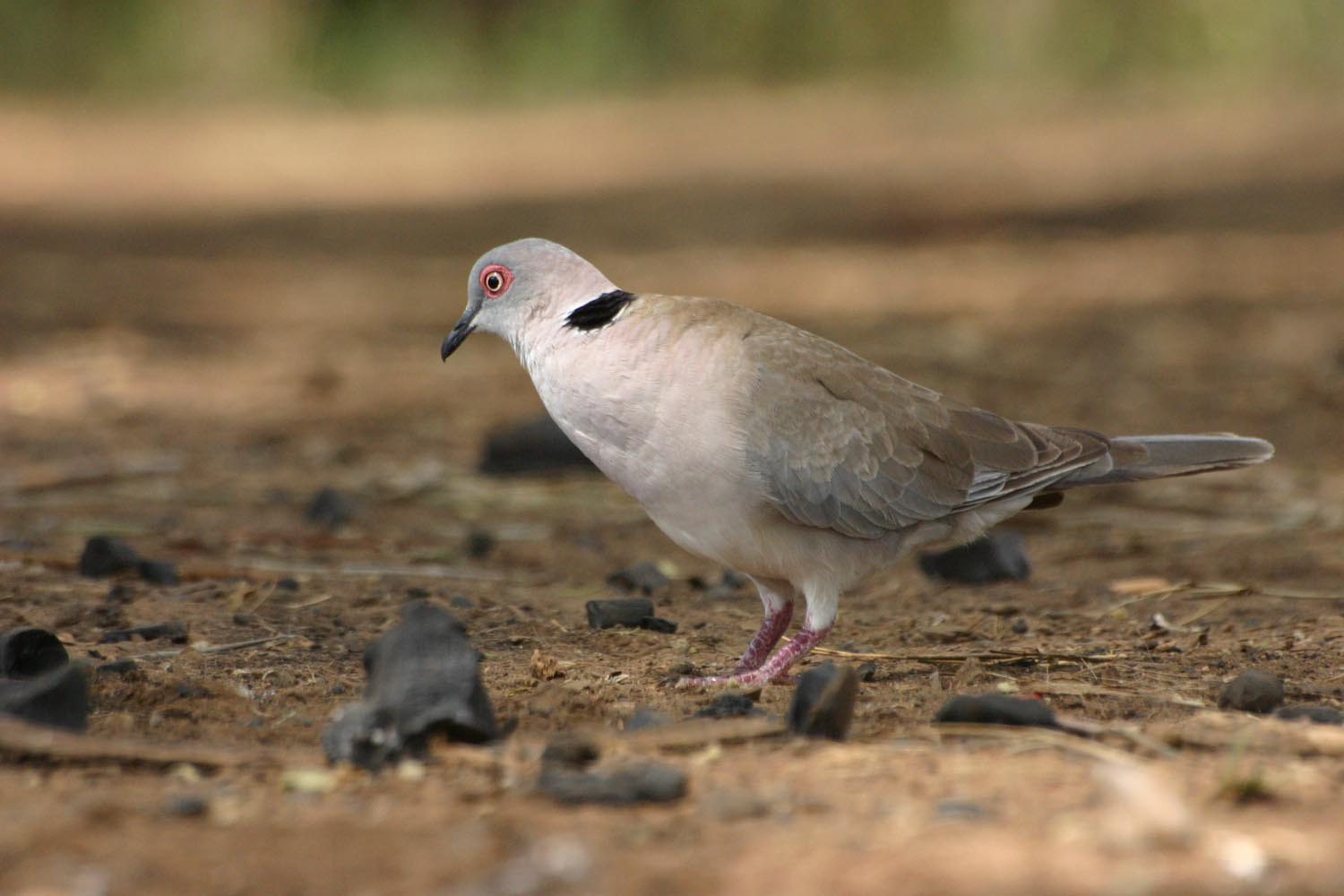
Mourning collared-dove in Samburu National Reserve.

Order: Columbiformes Family: Columbidae

Pigeons and doves are stout-bodied birds with short necks and short slender bills with a fleshy cere.

- Rock pigeon, Columba livia (njiwa-miamba)
- Speckled pigeon, Columba guinea (kunda)
- Rameron pigeon, Columba arquatrix (njiwa macho-njano)
- Delegorgue's pigeon, Columba delegorguei (njiwa kisogo-shaba)
- Lemon dove, Columba larvata (kipura)
- European turtle-dove, Streptopelia turtur (hua wa Ulaya) (A) (vulnerable)
- Dusky turtle-dove, Streptopelia lugens (hua kijivucheusi)
- White-winged collared-dove, Streptopelia reichenowi (hua mabawa-meupe) (near-threatened)
- Mourning collared-dove, Streptopelia decipiens (kuyu)
- Red-eyed dove, Streptopelia semitorquata (tetere macho-mekundu)
- Ring-necked dove, Streptopelia capicola (tetere macho-meusi)
- Laughing dove, Spilopelia senegalensis (fumvu)
- Emerald-spotted wood-dove, Turtur chalcospilos (pugi-kituku)
- Blue-spotted wood-dove, Turtur afer (pugi-wanda)
- Tambourine dove, Turtur tympanistria (pugi-kikombe)
- Namaqua dove, Oena capensis (tutu)
- Bruce's green-pigeon, Treron waalia (ninga tumbo-njano)
- African green-pigeon, Treron calvus (ninga)

== Sandgrouse ==
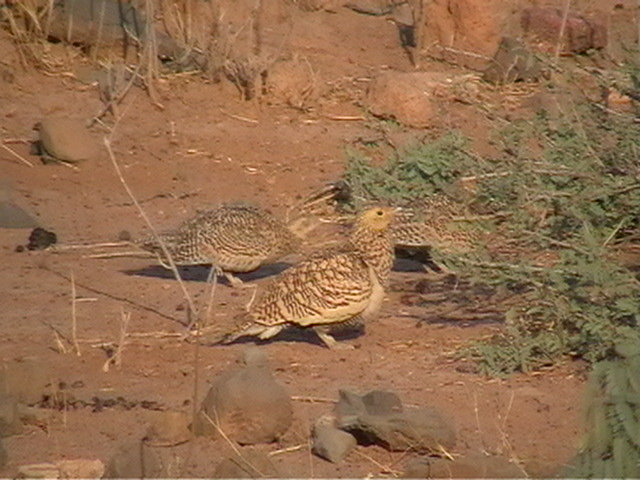
Chestnut-bellied sandgrouse

Order: Pterocliformes Family: Pteroclidae

Sandgrouse have small, pigeon-like heads and necks, but sturdy compact bodies. They have long pointed wings and sometimes tails and a fast direct flight. Flocks fly to watering holes at dawn and dusk. Their legs are feathered down to the toes.

- Chestnut-bellied sandgrouse, Pterocles exustus (firigogo tumbo-jekundu)
- Yellow-throated sandgrouse, Pterocles gutturalis (firigogo koo-njano)
- Black-faced sandgrouse, Pterocles decoratus (firigogo uso-mweusi)
- Lichtenstein's sandgrouse, Pterocles lichtensteinii (firigogo wa Lichtenstein)
- Four-banded sandgrouse, Pterocles quadricinctus (firigogo mikufu-minne)

== Bustards ==
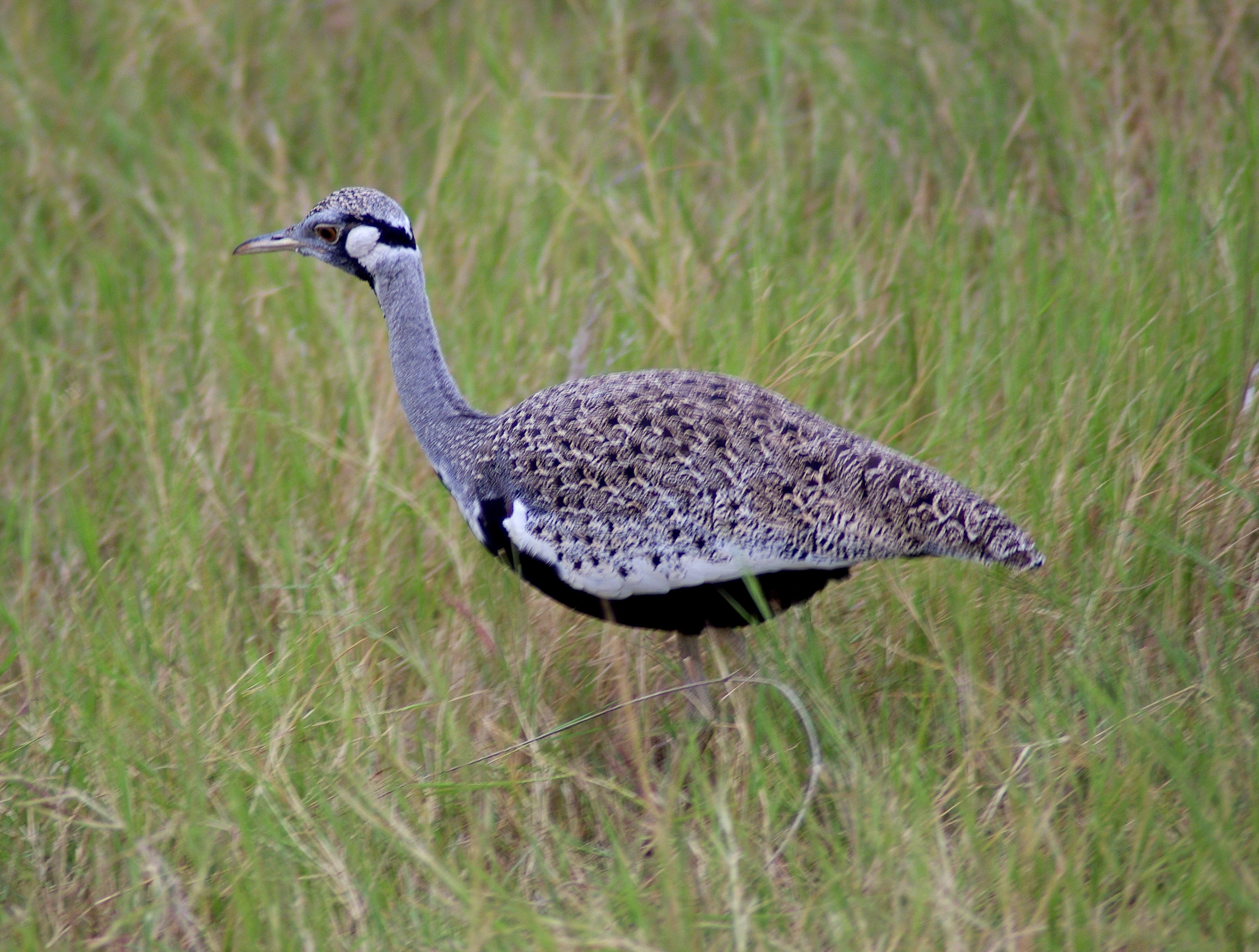
Adult male Hartlaub's bustard in Amboseli National Park.

Order: Otidiformes Family: Otididae

Bustards are large terrestrial birds mainly associated with dry open country and steppes in the Old World. They are omnivorous and nest on the ground. They walk steadily on strong legs and big toes, pecking for food as they go. They have long broad wings with "fingered" wingtips and striking patterns in flight. Many have interesting mating displays.

- Arabian bustard, Ardeotis arabs (tandawala arabu) (A) (near-threatened)
- Kori bustard, Ardeotis kori (tandawala mkubwa) (near-threatened)
- Denham's bustard, Neotis denhami (tandawala machaka) (near-threatened)
- Heuglin's bustard, Neotis heuglinii (tandawala wa Heuglin)
- White-bellied bustard, Eupodotis senegalensis (tandawala tumbo-jeupe)
- Buff-crested bustard, Lophotis gindiana (tandawala kishungi-hudhurungi)
- Black-bellied bustard, Lissotis melanogaster (tandawala tumbo-jeusi)
- Hartlaub's bustard, Lissotis hartlaubii (tandawala wa Hartlaub)

== Turacos ==
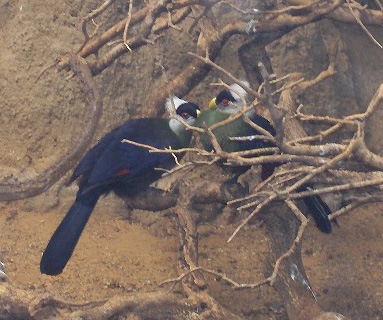
The white-crested turaco, a forest bird, occurs in Kenya mostly in the west-central region.

Order: Musophagiformes Family: Musophagidae

The turacos, plantain eaters, and go-away-birds make up the family Musophagidae. They are medium-sized arboreal birds. The turacos and plantain-eaters are brightly colored, usually blue, green, or purple. The go-away-birds are mostly gray and white.

- Great blue turaco, Corythaeola cristata (shorobo mkuu)
- Schalow's turaco, Tauraco schalowi (shorobo kibwenzi)
- Black-billed turaco, Tauraco schuettii (shorobo domo-jeusi)
- White-crested turaco, Tauraco leucolophus (shorobo kishungi-cheupe)
- Fischer's turaco, Tauraco fischeri (kulukulu) (near-threatened)
- Hartlaub's turaco, Tauraco hartlaubi (shorobo buluu)
- Purple-crested turaco, Gallirex porphyreolophus (shorobo kishungi-zambarau)
- Ross's turaco, Tauraco rossae (shorobo uzuri)
- Bare-faced go-away-bird, Corythaixoides personatus (gowee uso-mweusi)
- White-bellied go-away-bird, Corythaixoides leucogaster (gowee tumbo-jeupe)
- Eastern plantain-eater, Crinifer zonurus (shorobo mkia-miraba)

== Cuckoos ==
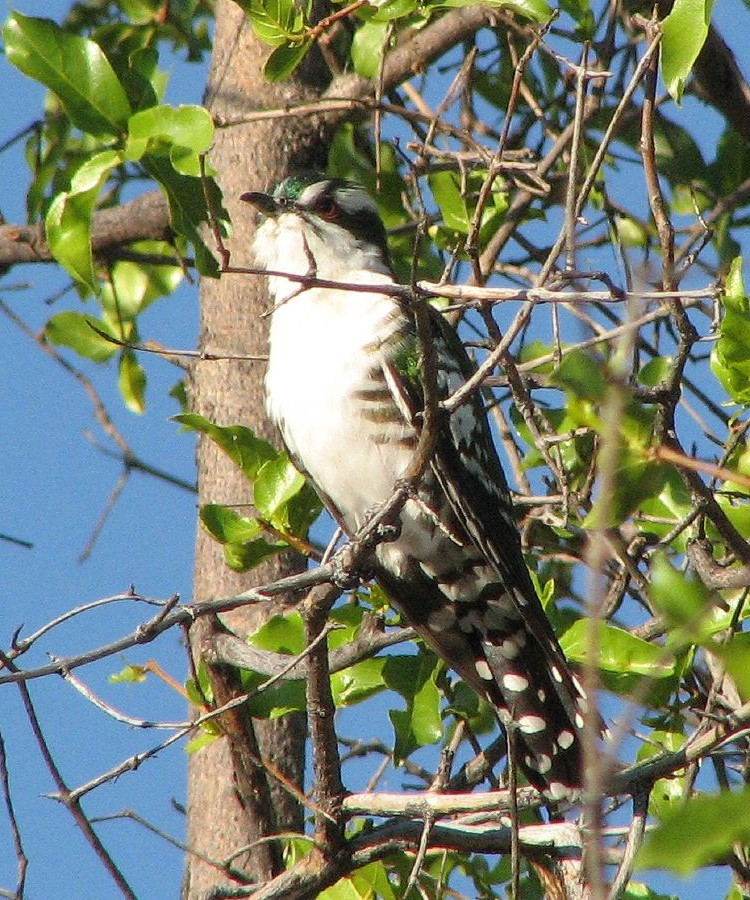
Dideric cuckoo

Order: Cuculiformes Family: Cuculidae

The family Cuculidae includes cuckoos, roadrunners, and anis. These birds are of variable size with slender bodies, long tails, and strong legs. The Old World cuckoos are brood parasites.

- Senegal coucal, Centropus senegalensis (dudumizi kichwa-cheusi)
- Blue-headed coucal, Centropus monachus (dudumizi kichwa-buluu)
- White-browed coucal, Centropus superciliosus (dudumizi nyusi-nyeupe)
- Black coucal, Centropus grillii (dudumizi mweusi)
- Blue malkoha, Ceuthmochares aereus (ukiki buluu)
- Green malkoha, Ceuthmochares australis (ukiki kijani)
- Great spotted cuckoo, Clamator glandarius (kekeo madoa)
- Levaillant's cuckoo, Clamator levaillantii (kekeo michirizi-myeusi)
- Pied cuckoo, Clamator jacobinus (kekeo rangi-mbili)
- Thick-billed cuckoo, Pachycoccyx audeberti (kekeo domo-nene)
- Dideric cuckoo, Chrysococcyx caprius (kekeo didariki)
- Klaas's cuckoo, Chrysococcyx klaas (kekeo shaba)
- African emerald cuckoo, Chrysococcyx cupreus (kekeo kijani)
- Barred long-tailed cuckoo, Cercococcyx montanus (kekeo mkia-mrefu)
- Black cuckoo, Cuculus clamosus (kekeo mweusi)
- Red-chested cuckoo, Cuculus solitarius (kekeo kidari-chekundu)
- Lesser cuckoo, Cuculus poliocephalus (kekeo mdogo)
- African cuckoo, Cuculus gularis (kekeo kijivu)
- Madagascar cuckoo, Cuculus rochii (kekeo wa Madagaska)
- Common cuckoo, Cuculus canorus (kekeo wa Ulaya)

== Nightjars and allies ==
Order: Caprimulgiformes Family: Caprimulgidae

Nightjars are medium-sized nocturnal birds that usually nest on the ground. They have long wings, short legs, and very short bills. Most have small feet, of little use for walking, and long pointed wings. Their soft plumage is camouflaged to resemble bark or leaves.

- Pennant-winged nightjar, Caprimulgus vexillarius (kirukanjia kalamu-mbili)
- Standard-winged nightjar, Caprimulgus longipennis (kirukanjia mileli-miwili)
- Eurasian nightjar, Caprimulgus europaeus (kirukanjia wa Ulaya)
- Sombre nightjar, Caprimulgus fraenatus (kirukanjia mileli-miwili)
- Nubian nightjar, Caprimulgus nubicus (kirukanjia Nubi)
- Donaldson-Smith's nightjar, Caprimulgus donaldsoni (kirukanjia mwekundu)
- Fiery-necked nightjar, Caprimulgus pectoralis (kirukanjia shingo-madoa)
- Montane nightjar, Caprimulgus poliocephalus (kirukanjia-milima)
- Swamp nightjar, Caprimulgus natalensis (kirukanjia mkia-mweupe)
- Plain nightjar, Caprimulgus inornatus (kirukanjia bilachoro)
- Star-spotted nightjar, Caprimulgus stellatus (kirukanjia madoa-nyota)
- Freckled nightjar, Caprimulgus tristigma (kirukanjia madoa)
- Long-tailed nightjar, Caprimulgus climacurus (kirukanjia mkia-mrefu) (A)
- Slender-tailed nightjar, Caprimulgus clarus (kirukanjia mkia-mwembamba)
- Square-tailed nightjar, Caprimulgus fossii (kirukanjia kijivucheusi)

== Swifts ==
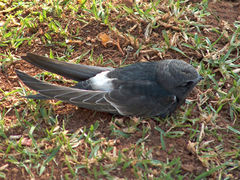
The white-rumped swift is widespread in the moister parts of the country in the range of the red-rumped swallow, whose nests it parasitizes.

Order: Apodiformes Family: Apodidae

Swifts are small birds which spend the majority of their lives flying. They have very short legs and never settle voluntarily on the ground, perching instead only on vertical surfaces. Many swifts have long swept-back wings which resemble a crescent or boomerang.

- Mottled spinetail, Telacanthura ussheri (teleka-mkiasindano koo-madoa)
- Sabine's spinetail, Rhaphidura sabini (teleka-mkiasindano wa Sabine)
- Bat-like spinetail, Neafrapus boehmi (teleka-mkiasindano popo) (A)
- Scarce swift, Schoutedenapus myoptilus (teleka kificho)
- Alpine swift, Apus melba (teleka tumbo-jeupe)
- Mottled swift, Apus aequatorialis (teleka mabaka)
- Common swift, Apus apus (teleka wa Ulaya)
- Nyanza swift, Apus niansae (teleka wa Nyanza)
- African swift, Apus barbatus (teleka mweusi)
- Forbes-Watson's swift, Apus berliozi (teleka Somali)
- Little swift, Apus affinis (teleka mdogo)
- Horus swift, Apus horus (teleka koo-kijivu)
- White-rumped swift, Apus caffer (teleka kiuno-cheupe)
- African palm-swift, Cypsiurus parvus (teleka-mitende)

== Flufftails ==
Order: Gruiformes Family: Sarothruridae

The flufftails are a small family of ground-dwelling birds found only in Madagascar and sub-Saharan Africa.

- White-spotted flufftail, Sarothrura pulchra (fuluwili madoa-meupe)
- Buff-spotted flufftail, Sarothrura elegans (fuluwili madoa-njano)
- Red-chested flufftail, Sarothrura rufa (fuluwili kidari-chekundu)
- Streaky-breasted flufftail, Sarothrura boehmi (fuluwili kidari-michirizi)
- Striped flufftail, Sarothrura affinis (fuluwili mkia-mwekundu)

== Rails, gallinules, and coots ==
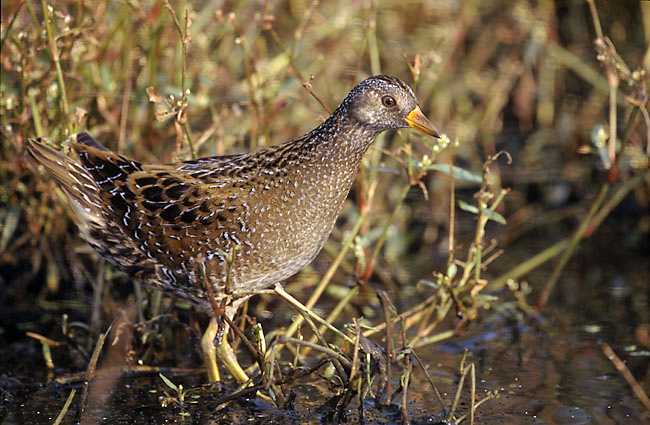
The spotted crake is a regular winter visitor to Kenya.

Order: Gruiformes Family: Rallidae

Rallidae is a large family of small to medium-sized birds which includes the rails, crakes, coots, and gallinules. Typically they inhabit dense vegetation in damp environments near lakes, swamps, or rivers. In general they are shy and secretive birds, making them difficult to observe. Most species have strong legs and long toes which are well adapted to soft uneven surfaces. They tend to have short, rounded wings and to be weak fliers.

- African rail, Rallus caerulescens (kibilinzi wa Afrika)
- Corn crake, Crex crex (kiluwiri wa Ulaya)
- African crake, Crex egregia (kiluwiri wa Afrika)
- Spotted crake, Porzana porzana (kiluwiri madoa)
- Lesser moorhen, Paragallinula angulata (kukuziwa mdogo)
- Eurasian moorhen, Gallinula chloropus (kukuziwa wa kawaida)
- Red-knobbed coot, Fulica cristata (kukuziwa pembenyekundu)
- Allen's gallinule, Porphyrio alleni (shaunge kijani)
- African swamphen, Porphyrio madagascariensis (shaunge)
- Striped crake, Amaurornis marginalis (kiluwiri michirizi)
- Black crake, Zapornia flavirostra (kiluwiri mweusi)
- Little crake, Zapornia parva (H) (kiluwiri mdogo)
- Baillon's crake, Zapornia pusilla (kiluwiri wa Baillon)

== Finfoots ==
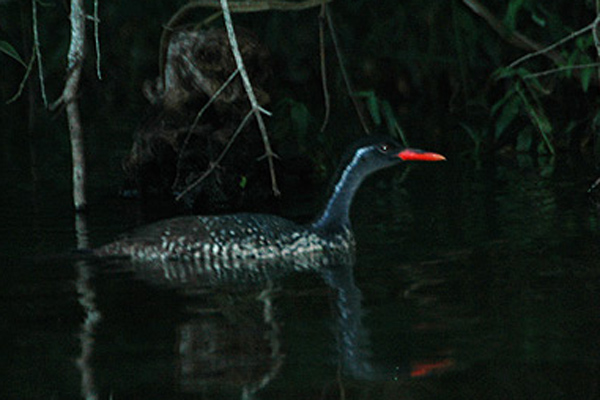
African finfoot

Order: Gruiformes Family: Heliornithidae

Heliornithidae is a small family of tropical birds with webbed lobes on their feet similar to those of grebes and coots.

- African finfoot, Podica senegalensis (kiguudau)

== Cranes ==
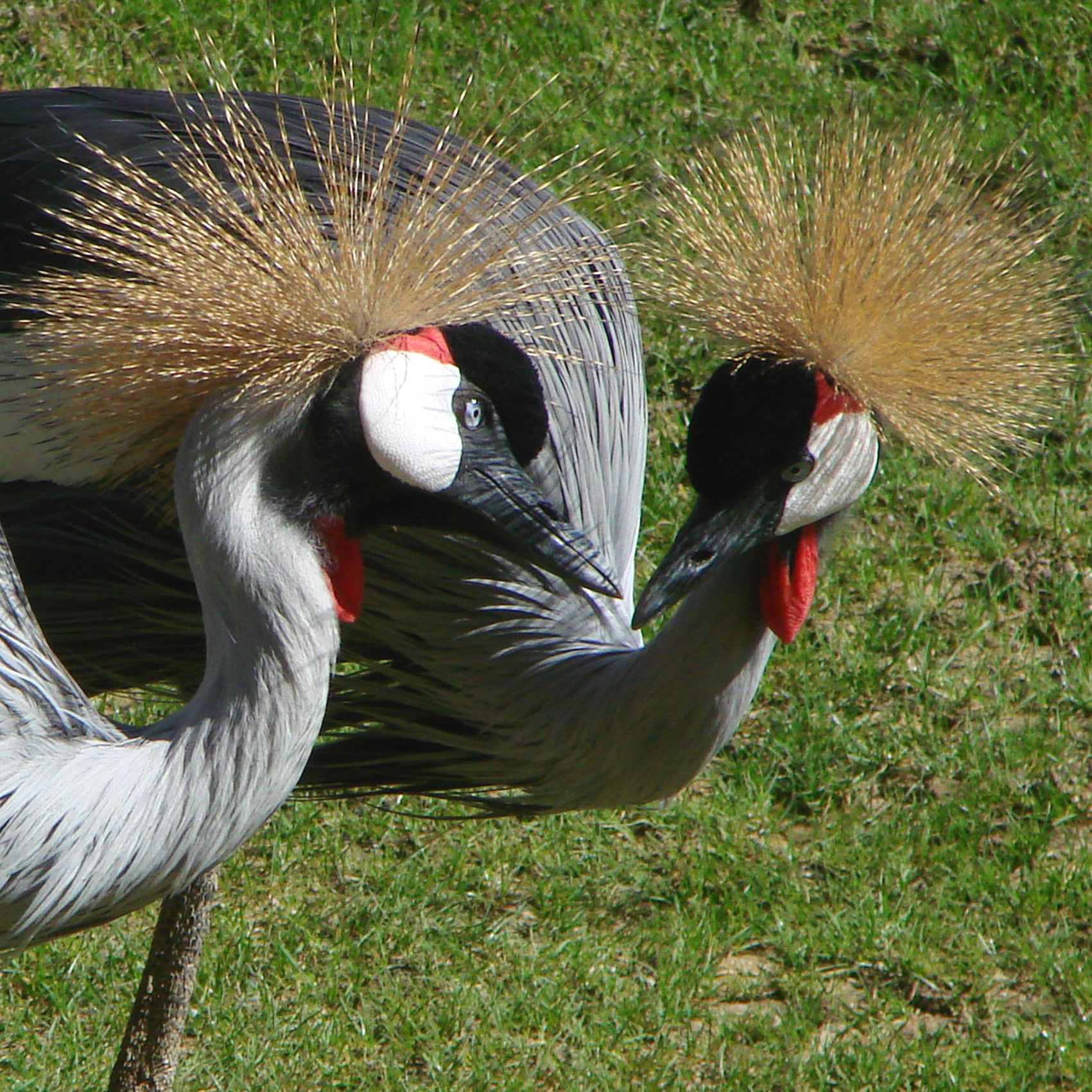
The gray crowned-crane occurs in western and central Kenya. Its spectacular looks make it a widely recognized symbol of Africa.

Order: Gruiformes Family: Gruidae

Cranes are large, long-legged, and long-necked birds. Unlike the similar-looking but unrelated herons, cranes fly with necks outstretched, not pulled back. Most have elaborate and noisy courting displays or "dances".

- Gray crowned-crane, Balearica regulorum (korongo-taji kijivu) (endangered)
- Black crowned-crane, Balearica pavonina (korongo-taji mweusi) (vulnerable)
- Demoiselle crane, Anthropoides virgo (korongo tumbo-jeusi) (A)
- Common crane, Grus grus (korongo paji-jeusi) (A)

== Thick-knees ==
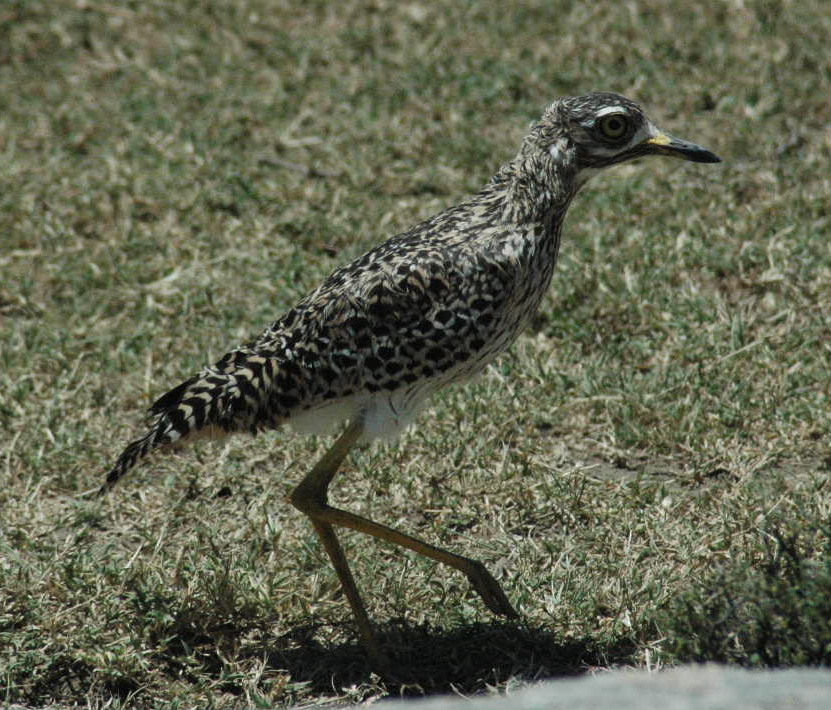
The spotted thick-knee is often heard and seen at night.

Order: Charadriiformes Family: Burhinidae

The thick-knees are a group of waders found worldwide within the tropical zone, with some species also breeding in temperate Europe and Australia. They are medium to large waders with strong black or yellow-black bills, large yellow eyes, and cryptic plumage. Despite being classed as waders, most species have a preference for arid or semi-arid habitats.

- Water thick-knee, Burhinus vermiculatus (chekeamwezi)
- Eurasian thick-knee, Burhinus oedicnemus (chekehukwa wa Ulaya) (A)
- Senegal thick-knee, Burhinus senegalensis (chekehukwa magharibi)
- Spotted thick-knee, Burhinus capensis (chekehukwa madoa)

== Egyptian plover ==
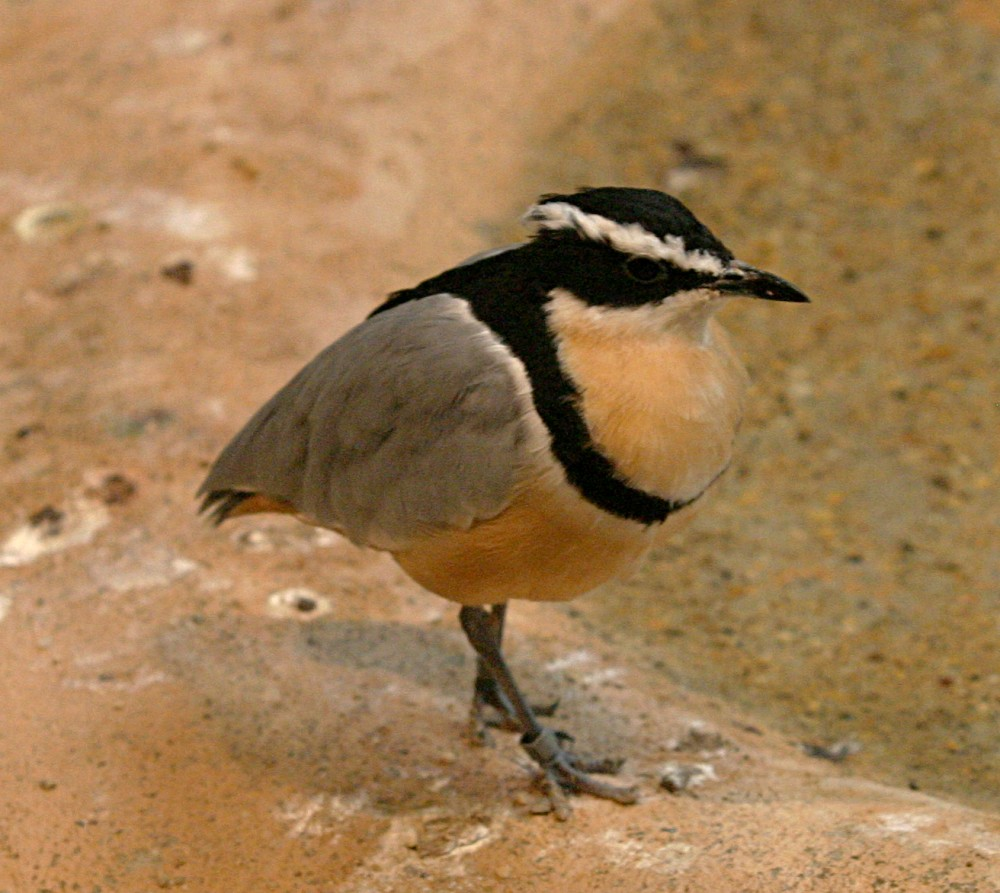
Egyptian plover

Order: Charadriiformes Family: Pluvianidae

The Egyptian plover is found across equatorial Africa and along the Nile River.

- Egyptian plover, Pluvianus aegyptius (cheruku-mamba) (A)

== Stilts and avocets ==
Order: Charadriiformes Family: Recurvirostridae

Recurvirostridae is a family of large wading birds which includes the avocets and stilts. The avocets have long legs and long up-curved bills. The stilts have extremely long legs and long, thin, straight bills.

- Black-winged stilt, Himantopus himantopus (msese milonjo)
- Pied avocet, Recurvirostra avosetta (msese domojuu)

== Oystercatchers ==
Order: Charadriiformes Family: Haematopodidae

The oystercatchers are large and noisy plover-like birds, with strong bills used for smashing or prising open molluscs.

- Eurasian oystercatcher, Haematopus ostralegus (kizamiachaza)

== Plovers and lapwings ==
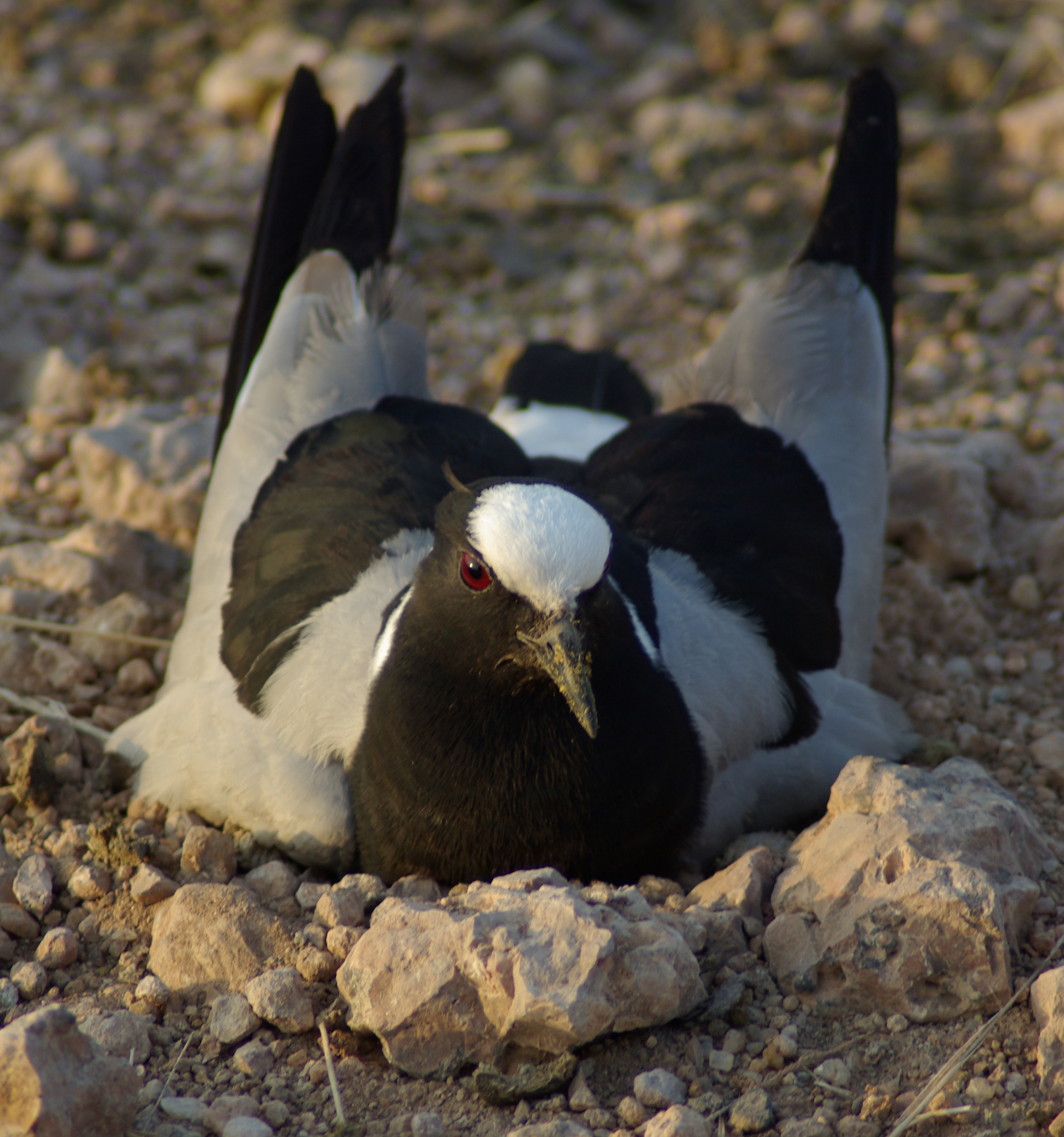
Blacksmith lapwing nesting in Amboseli National Park.

Order: Charadriiformes Family: Charadriidae

The family Charadriidae includes the plovers, dotterels, and lapwings. They are small to medium-sized birds with compact bodies, short thick necks, and long, usually pointed, wings. They are found in open country worldwide, mostly in habitats near water.

- Black-bellied plover, Pluvialis squatarola (kitwitwi kijivu)
- Pacific golden-plover, Pluvialis fulva (kitwitwi dhahabu)
- Northern lapwing, Vanellus vanellus (kiluwiluwi wa Ulaya) (A) (near-threatened)
- Long-toed lapwing, Vanellus crassirostris (kiluwiluwi madole-marefu)
- Blacksmith lapwing, Vanellus armatus (kiluwiluwi fundichuma)
- Spur-winged lapwing, Vanellus spinosus (kiluwiluwi kizibao-cheusi)
- Black-headed lapwing, Vanellus tectus (kiluwiluwi kishungi)
- Senegal lapwing, Vanellus lugubris (kiluwijivu)
- Black-winged lapwing, Vanellus melanopterus (kiluwiluwi kidari-madoa)
- Crowned lapwing, Vanellus coronatus (kiluwitaji)
- Wattled lapwing, Vanellus senegallus (kiluwingozi)
- Brown-chested lapwing, Vanellus superciliosus (kiluwiluwi kidari-chekundu) (A)
- Lesser sand-plover, Anarhynchus mongolus (kitwitwi koo-jeupe)
- Greater sand-plover, Anarhynchus leschenaultii (kitwitwi mkia-mrefu)
- Caspian plover, Anarhynchus asiaticus (kitwitwi kidari-chekundu)
- Kittlitz's plover, Anarhynchus pecuarius (kitwitwi kipipi)
- Kentish plover, Anarhynchus alexandrinus (kitwitwi ukosi-mwekundu)
- Common ringed plover, Charadrius hiaticula (kitwitwi mkufu-mweusi)
- Little ringed plover, Charadrius dubius (kitwitwi macho-njano)
- Three-banded plover, Charadrius tricollaris (kitwitwi mikufu-mitatu)
- White-fronted plover, Charadrius marginatus (kitwitwi paji-jeupe)
- Chestnut-banded plover, Charadrius pallidus (kitwitwi mkufu-mwekundu) (near-threatened)

== Painted-snipes ==
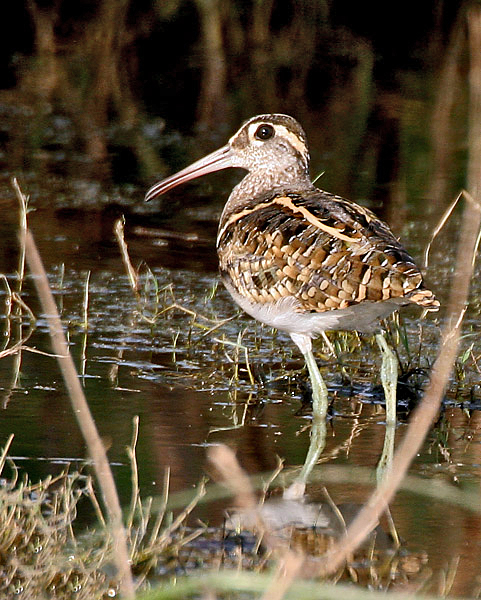
A female greater painted-snipe

Order: Charadriiformes Family: Rostratulidae

Painted-snipes are short-legged, long-billed birds similar in shape to the true snipes, but more brightly colored.

- Greater painted-snipe, Rostratula benghalensis (sululu uzuri)

== Jacanas ==
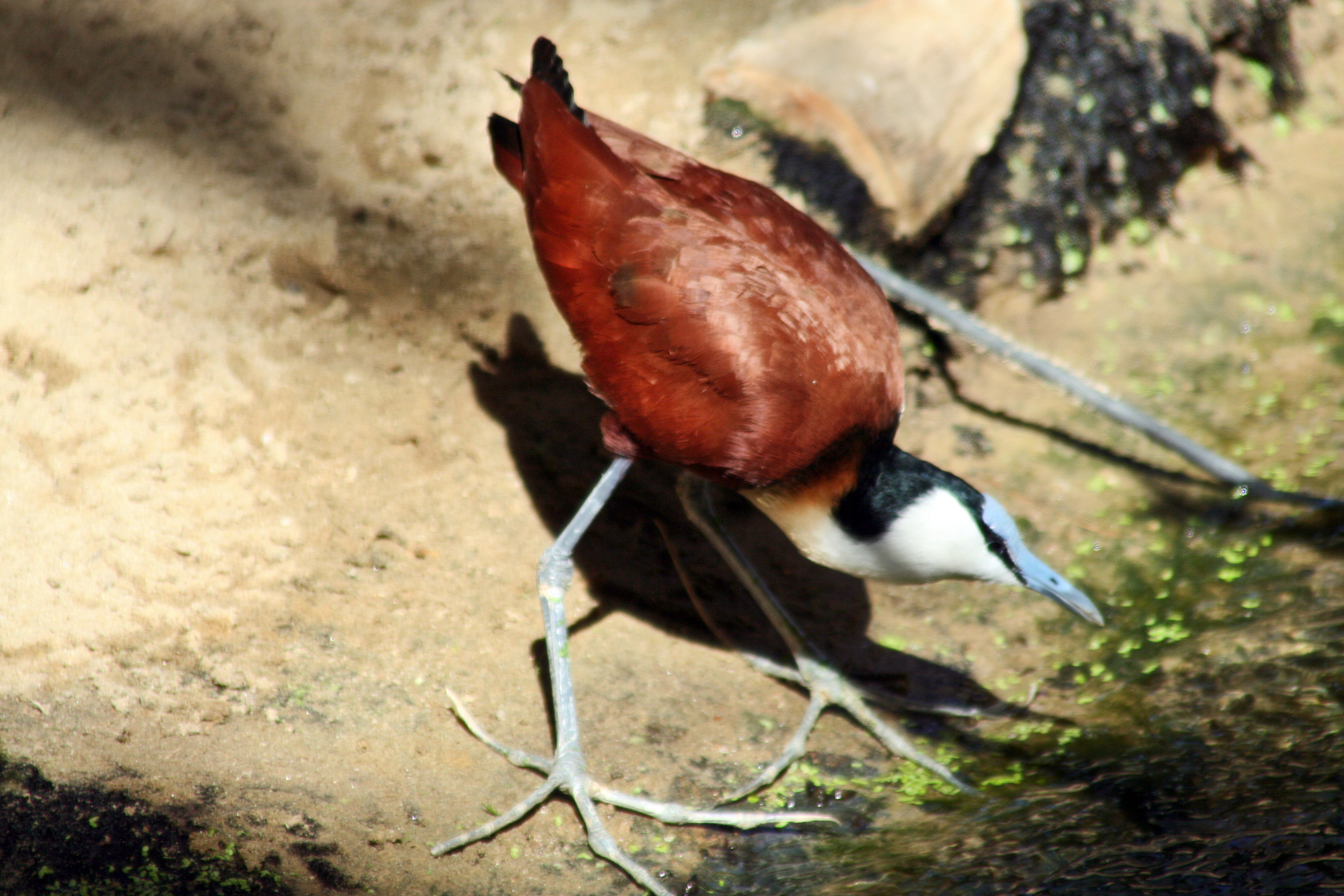
The African jacana is often seen in slow-moving bodies of water.

Order: Charadriiformes Family: Jacanidae

The jacanas are a family of waders that are found throughout the tropics. They are identifiable by their huge feet and claws which enable them to walk on floating vegetation in the shallow lakes that are their preferred habitat.

- Lesser jacana, Microparra capensis (sile-maua mdogo)
- African jacana, Actophilornis africanus (sile-maua)

== Sandpipers and allies ==
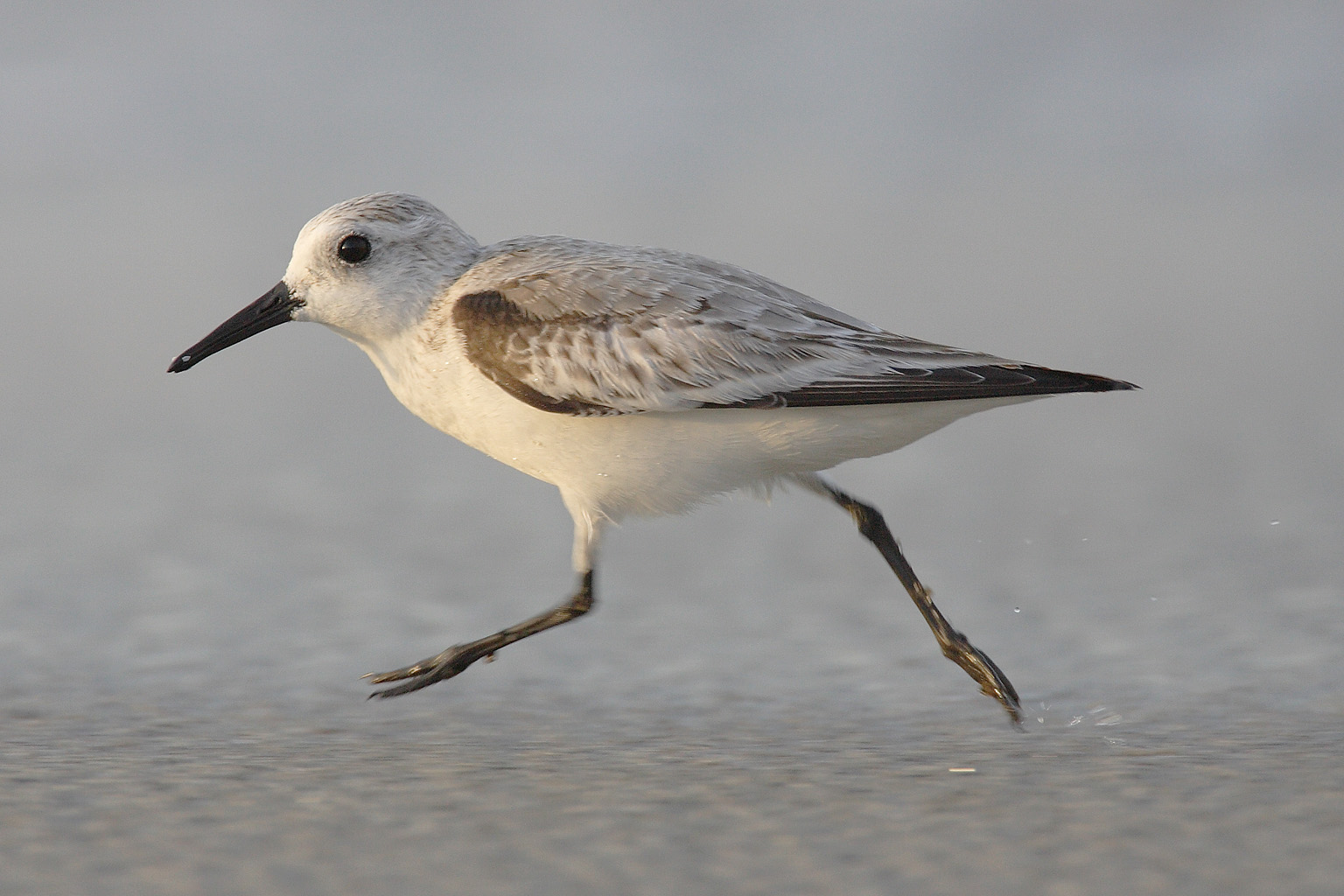
The sanderling breeds in the far north; it is common on the Kenyan coast from late August to April.

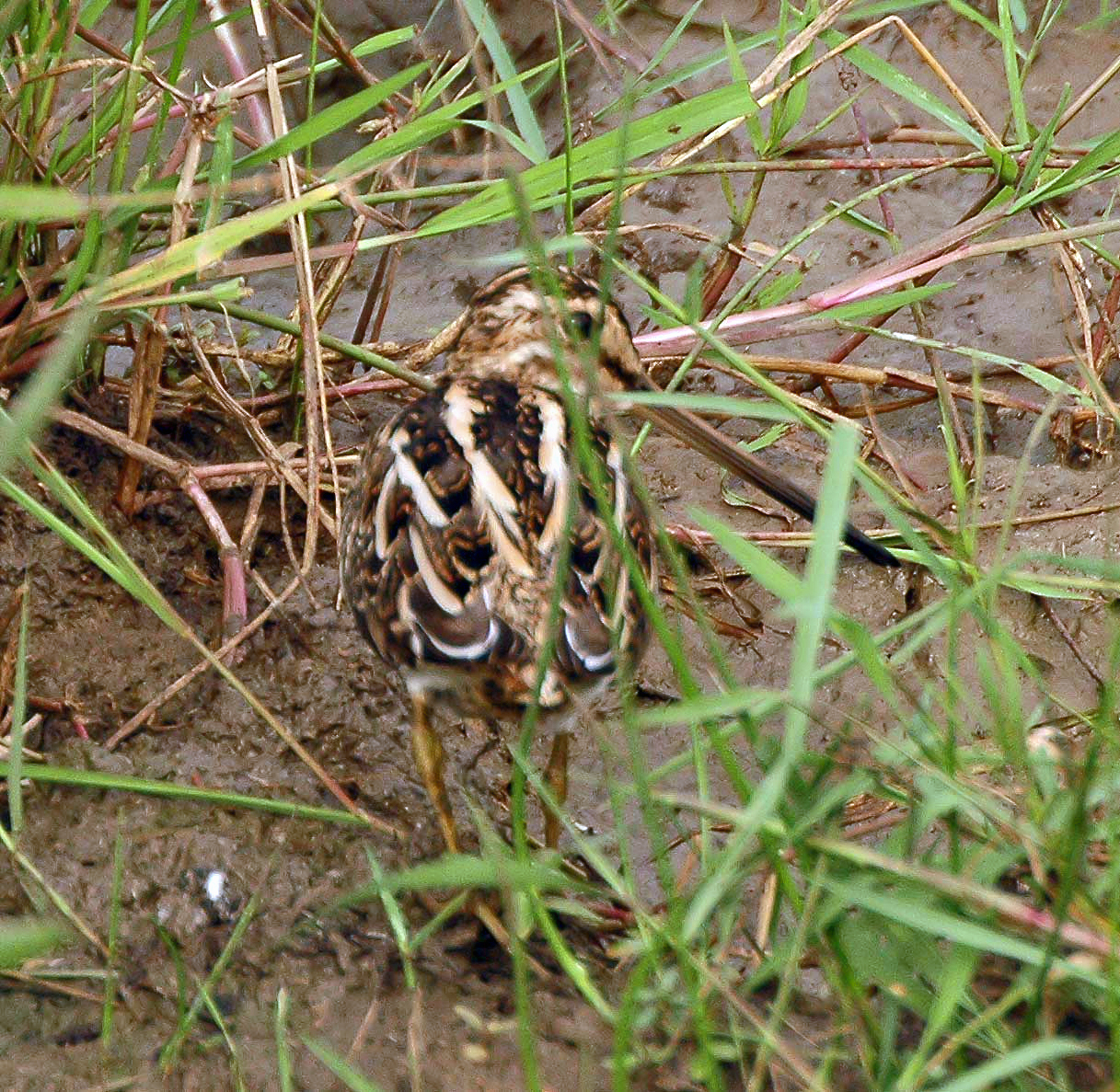
African snipe

Order: Charadriiformes Family: Scolopacidae

Scolopacidae is a large diverse family of small to medium-sized shorebirds including the sandpipers, curlews, godwits, shanks, tattlers, woodcocks, snipes, dowitchers, and phalaropes. The majority of these species eat small invertebrates picked out of the mud or soil. Variation in length of legs and bills enables multiple species to feed in the same habitat, particularly on the coast, without direct competition for food.

- Whimbrel, Numenius phaeopus (membe sautisaba)
- Eurasian curlew, Numenius arquata (near-threatened) (membe sululu)
- Bar-tailed godwit, Limosa lapponica (near-threatened) (msese mkia-miraba)
- Black-tailed godwit, Limosa limosa (near-threatened) (msese mkia-mweusi)
- Ruddy turnstone, Arenaria interpres (kigeuzamawe kahawia)
- Red knot, Calidris canutus (chokowe mwekundu) (A) (near-threatened)
- Ruff, Calidris pugnax (chokowe mjasiri)
- Broad-billed sandpiper, Calidris falcinellus (chokowe domo-pana)
- Curlew sandpiper, Calidris ferruginea (chokowe domo-sululu) (near-threatened)
- Temminck's stint, Calidris temminckii (chokowe mkia-mweupe)
- Long-toed stint, Calidris subminuta (chokowe vidole-virefu) (A)
- Red-necked stint, Calidris ruficollis (chokowe shingo-nyekundu) (A) (near-threatened)
- Sanderling, Calidris alba (chokowe tumbo-jeupe)
- Dunlin, Calidris alpina (chokowe tumbo-jeusi) (A)
- Little stint, Calidris minuta (chokowe mdogo)
- Buff-breasted sandpiper, Calidris subruficollis (chokowe shingo-njano) (A) (near-threatened)
- Pectoral sandpiper, Calidris melanotos (chokowe fulana) (A)
- Jack snipe, Lymnocryptes minimus (sulul mdogo)
- Great snipe, Gallinago media (sululu mkubwa) (near-threatened)
- Common snipe, Gallinago gallinago (sululu wa Ulaya)
- Pin-tailed snipe, Gallinago stenura (sululu mkia-chembe) (A)
- African snipe, Gallinago nigripennis (sululu wa Afrika)
- Terek sandpiper, Xenus cinereus (chamchanga kijivu)
- Red-necked phalarope, Phalaropus lobatus (kipwita ukosi-mwekundu)
- Red phalarope, Phalaropus fulicarius (kipwita mwekundu) (A)
- Common sandpiper, Actitis hypoleucos (kiulimazi)
- Spotted sandpiper, Actitis macularius (kiulimazi madoa) (A)
- Green sandpiper, Tringa ochropus (chamchanga kijani)
- Spotted redshank, Tringa erythropus (chamchanga madoa)
- Common greenshank, Tringa nebularia (chamchanga miguu-kijani)
- Marsh sandpiper, Tringa stagnatilis (chamchanga-wamgwa)
- Wood sandpiper, Tringa glareola (chamchanga mtoni)
- Common redshank, Tringa totanus (chokowe miguu-hina)

== Buttonquails ==
Order: Charadriiformes Family: Turnicidae

The buttonquails are small, drab, running birds which resemble the true quails. The female is the brighter of the sexes and initiates courtship. The male incubates the eggs and tends the young.

- Small buttonquail, Turnix sylvaticus (kipululu wa Afrika)
- Black-rumped buttonquail, Turnix nanus (kipululu kiuno-cheusi)
- Quail-plover, Ortyxelos meiffrenii (kiunzi)

== Crab-plover ==
Order: Charadriiformes Family: Dromadidae

The crab-plover is related to the waders. It resembles a plover but with very long grey legs and a strong heavy black bill similar to a tern's. It has black-and-white plumage, a long neck, partially webbed feet, and a bill designed for eating crabs.

- Crab-plover, Dromas ardeola (ndoero)

== Pratincoles and coursers ==
Order: Charadriiformes Family: Glareolidae

Glareolidae is a family of wading birds comprising the pratincoles, which have short legs, long pointed wings, and long forked tails, and the coursers, which have long legs, short wings, and long, pointed bills which curve downwards.

- Cream-colored courser, Cursorius cursor (cheruku kaskazi) (A)
- Somali courser, Cursorius somalensis (cheruku Somali)
- Temminck's courser, Cursorius temminckii (cheruku utosi-mwekundu)
- Double-banded courser, Smutsornis africanus (cheruku mikufu-miwili)
- Three-banded courser, Rhinoptilus cinctus (cheruku mikufu-mitatu)
- Bronze-winged courser, Rhinoptilus chalcopterus (cheruku mabawa-shaba)
- Collared pratincole, Glareola pratincola (bwabwaja koo-njano)
- Black-winged pratincole, Glareola nordmanni (bwabwaja mabawa-meusi) (A) (near-threatened)
- Madagascar pratincole, Glareola ocularis (bwabwaja wa Madagaska) (vulnerable)
- Rock pratincole, Glareola nuchalis (cheruku ukosi-mweupe)

== Skuas and jaegers ==
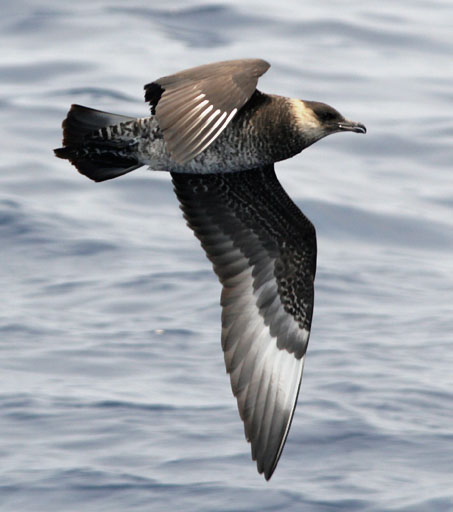
Pomarine jaeger

Order: Charadriiformes Family: Stercorariidae

The family Stercorariidae are, in general, medium to large birds, typically with grey or brown plumage, often with white markings on the wings. They nest on the ground in temperate and arctic regions and are long-distance migrants.

- Brown skua, Stercorarius antarcticus (shakwe-mporaji kahawia) (A)
- Pomarine jaeger, Stercorarius pomarinus (shakwe-mporaji pomarina)
- Parasitic jaeger, Stercorarius parasiticus (shakwe-mporaji wa Akitiki) (A)
- Long-tailed jaeger, Stercorarius longicaudus (shakwe-mporaji mkia-mrefu) (A)

== Gulls, terns, and skimmers ==
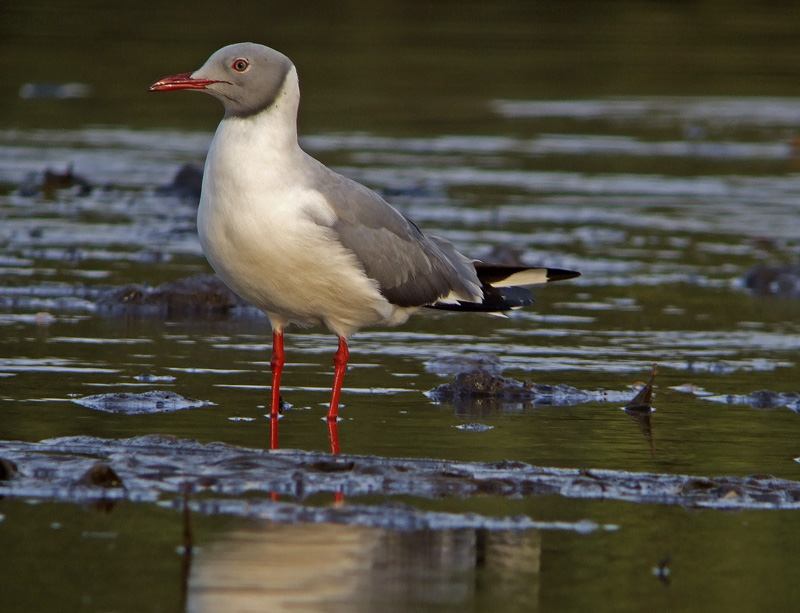
The gray-hooded gull is the only gull that breeds in Kenya in significant numbers.

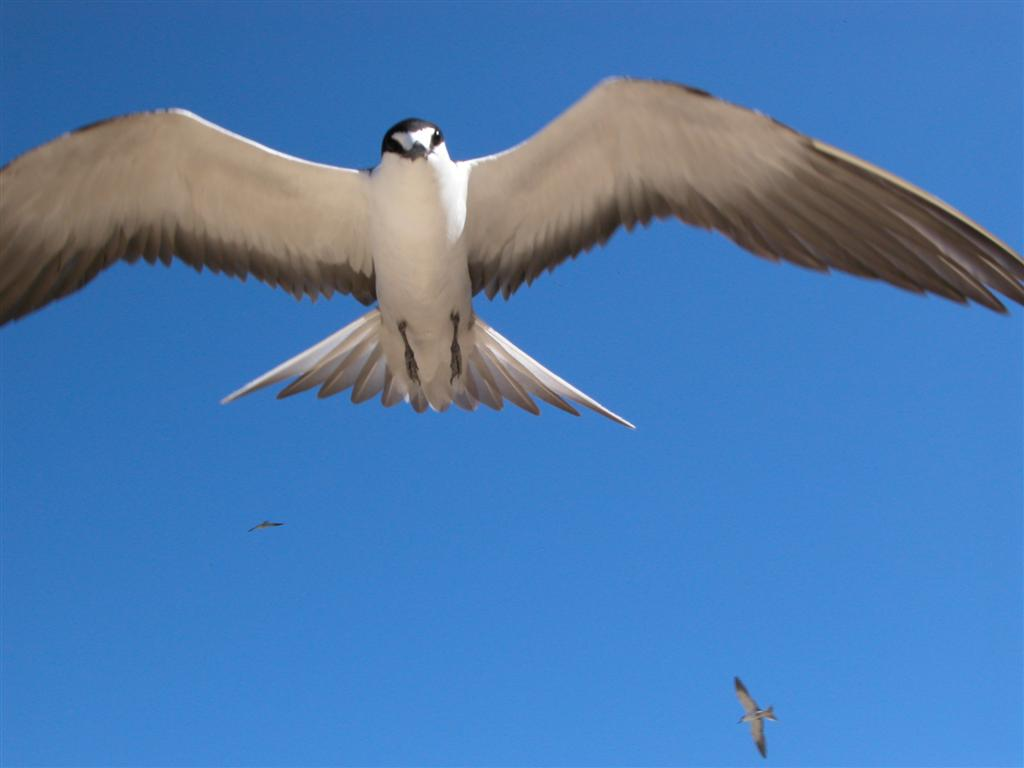
The sooty tern is common in Kenyan waters beyond the offshore reef.

Order: Charadriiformes Family: Laridae

Laridae is a family of medium to large seabirds, the gulls, kittiwakes, terns, and skimmers. Gulls are typically gray or white, often with black markings on the head or wings. They have stout, longish bills and webbed feet. Terns are a group of generally medium to large seabirds typically with gray or white plumage, often with black markings on the head. Most terns hunt fish by diving but some pick insects off the surface of fresh water. Terns are generally long-lived birds, with several species known to live in excess of 30 years. Skimmers are a small family of tropical tern-like birds. They have an elongated lower mandible which they use to feed by flying low over the water surface and skimming the water for small fish.

- Sabine's gull, Xema sabini (shakwe wa Sabine) (A)
- Slender-billed gull, Chroicocephalus genei (shakwe domo-jembamba)
- Gray-hooded gull, Chroicocephalus cirrocephalus (shakwe kichwa-kijivu)
- Black-headed gull, Chroicocephalus ridibundus (shakwe kichwa-kahawia)
- Little gull, Hydrocoloeus minutus (shakwe mdogo) (A)
- Mediterranean gull, Ichthyaetus melanocephalus (shakwe wa Mediteranea) (A)
- White-eyed gull, Ichthyaetus leucophthalmus (shakwe macho-meupe) (A)
- Sooty gull, Ichthyaetus hemprichii (shakwe kijivucheusi)
- Pallas's gull, Ichthyaetus ichthyaetus (shakwe kichwa-cheusi)
- Common gull, Larus canus (shakwe wa Ulaya) (A)
- Lesser black-backed gull, Larus fuscus (shakwe mgongo-mweusi)
- Kelp gull, Larus dominicanus (shakwe mgongo-mweusi kusi) (A)
- Brown noddy, Anous stolidus (buabua kahawia)
- Lesser noddy, Anous tenuirostris (buabua domo-jembamba) (A)
- Sooty tern, Onychoprion fuscatus (buabua mgongo-mweusi)
- Bridled tern, Onychoprion anaethetus (buabua mgongo-kijivu)
- Little tern, Sternula albifrons (buabua kibete) (A)
- Saunders's tern, Sternula saundersi (buabua wa Saunders)
- Gull-billed tern, Gelochelidon nilotica (buabua domo-nene)
- Caspian tern, Hydroprogne caspia (buabua domo-kubwa)
- Black tern, Chlidonias niger (buabua mabawa-kijivu) (A)
- White-winged tern, Chlidonias leucopterus (buabua mabawa-meupe)
- Whiskered tern, Chlidonias hybrida (buabua masharubu)
- Roseate tern, Sterna dougallii (buabua mkia-mshale)
- Common tern, Sterna hirundo (buabua mbayuwayu)
- Arctic tern, Sterna paradisaea (buabua wa Akitiki) (A)
- White-cheeked tern, Sterna repressa (buabua mashavu-meupe)
- Great crested tern, Thalasseus bergii (buabua kishungi mkubwa)
- Sandwich tern, Thalasseus sandvicensis (buabua domo-rangimbili)
- Lesser crested tern, Thalasseus bengalensis (buabua kishungi mdogo)
- African skimmer, Rynchops flavirostris (kiparara) (near-threatened)

== Tropicbirds ==
Order: Phaethontiformes Family: Phaethontidae

Tropicbirds are slender white birds of tropical oceans, with exceptionally long central tail feathers. Their heads and long wings have black markings.

- White-tailed tropicbird, Phaethon lepturus (ndege-mawingu mkia-mweupe)
- Red-billed tropicbird, Phaethon aethereus (ndege-mawingu domo-jekundu) (A)
- Red-tailed tropicbird, Phaethon rubricauda (ndege-mawingu mkia-mwekundu) (A)

== Albatrosses ==
Order: Procellariiformes Family: Diomedeidae

The albatrosses are among the largest of flying birds, and the great albatrosses of the genus Diomedea have the largest wingspans of any extant birds.

- White-capped albatross, Thalassarche cauta (albatrosi utosi-mweupe) (A)
- Black-browed albatross, Thalassarche melanophris (albatrosi nyusi-nyeusi) (A)

== Southern storm-petrels ==
Order: Procellariiformes Family: Oceanitidae

The storm-petrels are the smallest seabirds, relatives of the petrels, feeding on planktonic crustaceans and small fish picked from the surface, typically while hovering. The flight is fluttering and sometimes bat-like. Until 2018, this family's species were included with the other storm-petrels in family Hydrobatidae.

- Wilson's storm-petrel, Oceanites oceanicus (ninga-bahari wa Wilson)
- Black-bellied storm-petrel, Fregetta tropica (ninga-bahari tumbo-jeusi) (A)

== Northern storm-petrels ==
Order: Procellariiformes Family: Hydrobatidae

Though the members of this family are similar in many respects to the southern storm-petrels, including their general appearance and habits, there are enough genetic differences to warrant their placement in a separate family.

- Leach's storm-petrel, Hydrobates leucorhous (ninga-bahari tako-jeusi) (A) (vulnerable)
- Matsudaira's storm-petrel, Hydrobates matsudairae (ninga-bahari wa Matsudaira) (A) (vulnerable)

== Shearwaters and petrels ==
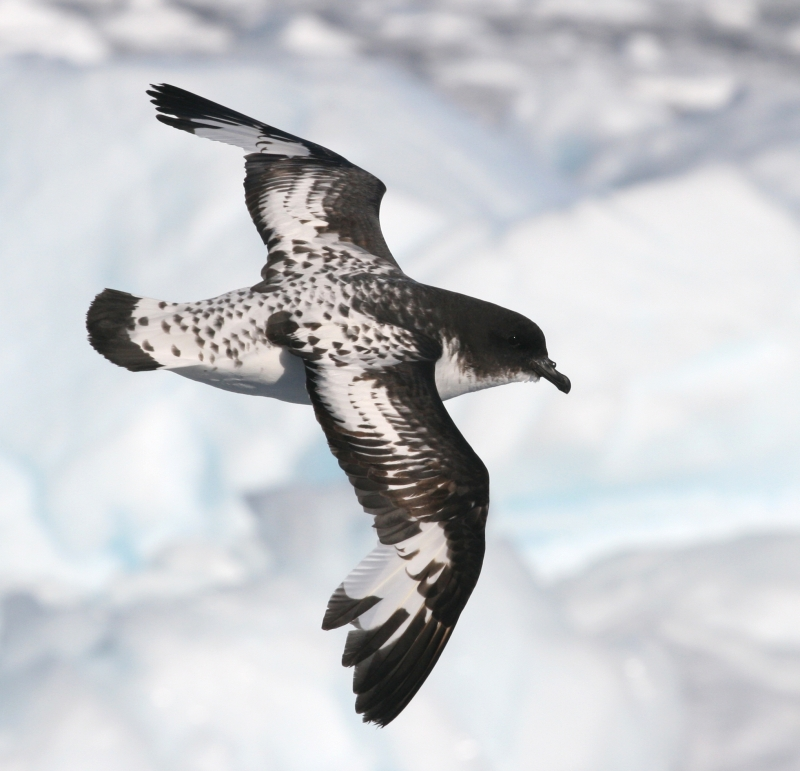
Cape petrel

Order: Procellariiformes Family: Procellariidae

The procellariids are the main group of medium-sized "true petrels", characterised by united nostrils with medium septum and a long outer functional primary.

- Southern giant-petrel, Macronectes giganteus (kwazi-bahari) (H)
- Cape petrel, Daption capense (mlinzi kichwa-cheusi) (A)
- Antarctic prion, Pachyptila desolata (mlinzi wa kisiwa Desolation) (A)
- Slender-billed prion, Pachyptila belcheri (mlinzi domo-jembamba) (A)
- Jouanin's petrel, Bulweria fallax (mlinzi wa Jouanin) (A) (near-threatened)
- White-chinned petrel, Procellaria aequinoctialis (mlinzi kidevi-cheupe) (A) (vulnerable)
- Wedge-tailed shearwater, Ardenna pacifica (mlinzi mkia-kabari) (A)
- Sooty shearwater, Ardenna grisea (mlinzi kijivucheusi) (A) (near-threatened)
- Tropical shearwater, Puffinus bailloni (mlinzi wa Baillon)
- Persian shearwater, Puffinus persicus (mlinzi wa Uajemi) (A)

== Storks ==
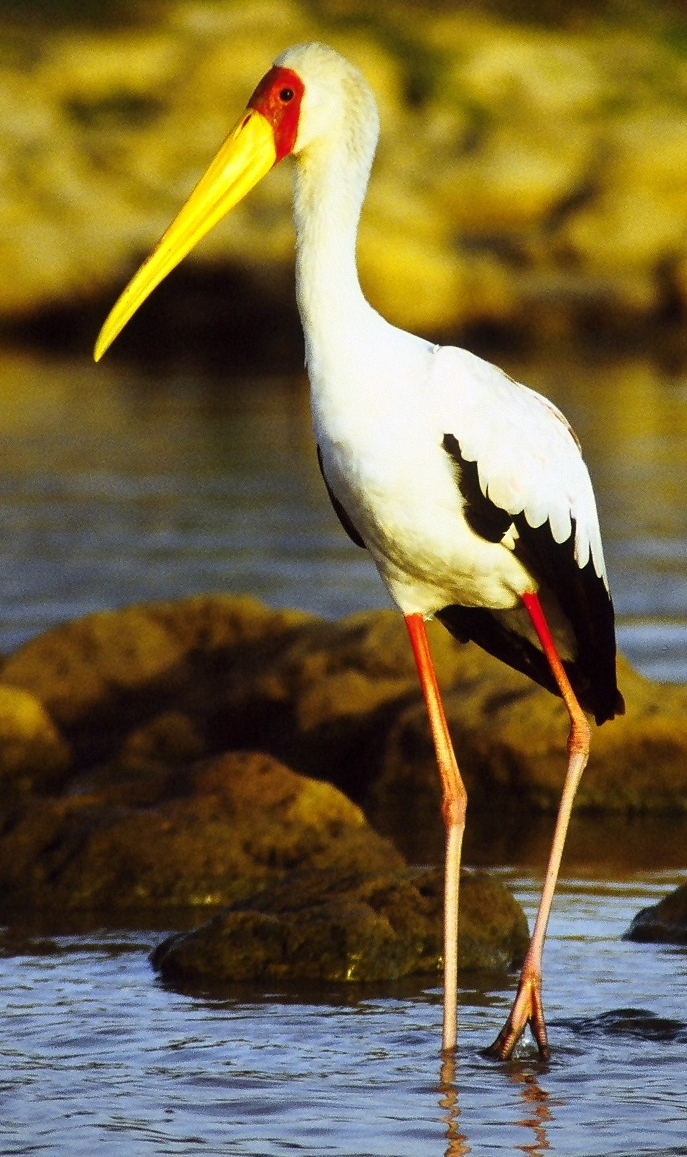
Yellow-billed stork at Lake Baringo.

Order: Ciconiiformes Family: Ciconiidae

Storks are large, long-legged, long-necked wading birds with long, stout bills. Storks are mute, but bill-clattering is an important mode of communication at the nest. Their nests can be large and may be reused for many years. Many species are migratory.

- African openbill, Anastomus lamelligerus (korongo domo-wazi)
- Black stork, Ciconia nigra (korongo mweusi)
- Abdim's stork, Ciconia abdimii (korongo samawati)
- African woolly-necked stork, Ciconia microscelis (korongo shingo-sufu)
- White stork, Ciconia ciconia (korongo mweupe)
- Saddle-billed stork, Ephippiorhynchus senegalensis (korongo domo-ngazi)
- Marabou stork, Leptoptilos crumenifer (korongo mfuko-shingo)
- Yellow-billed stork, Mycteria ibis (korongo domo-njano)

== Frigatebirds ==
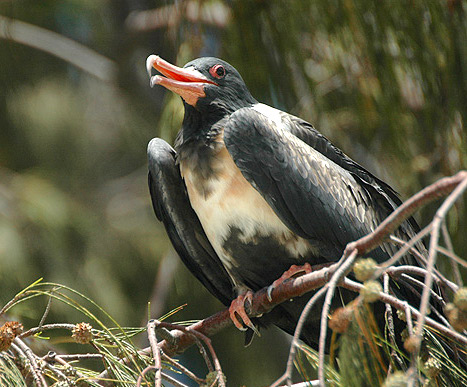
Lesser frigatebird

Order: Suliformes Family: Fregatidae

Frigatebirds are large seabirds usually found over tropical oceans. They are large, black-and-white, or completely black, with long wings and deeply forked tails. The males have colored inflatable throat pouches. They do not swim or walk and cannot take off from a flat surface. Having the largest wingspan-to-body-weight ratio of any bird, they are essentially aerial, able to stay aloft for more than a week.

- Lesser frigatebird, Fregata ariel (mnandi-pwani mdogo) (A)
- Christmas Island frigatebird, Fregata andrewsi (mnandi-pwani wa Kisiwa Krisimasi) (A)
- Great frigatebird, Fregata minor (mnandi-pwani mkubwa) (A)

== Boobies and gannets ==
Order: Suliformes Family: Sulidae

The sulids comprise the gannets and boobies. Both groups are medium to large coastal seabirds that plunge-dive for fish.

- Masked booby, Sula dactylatra (ndegejinga kinyago)
- Brown booby, Sula leucogaster (ndegejinga tumbo-jeupe)
- Red-footed booby, Sula sula (ndegejinga miguu-myekundu) (A)

== Anhingas ==
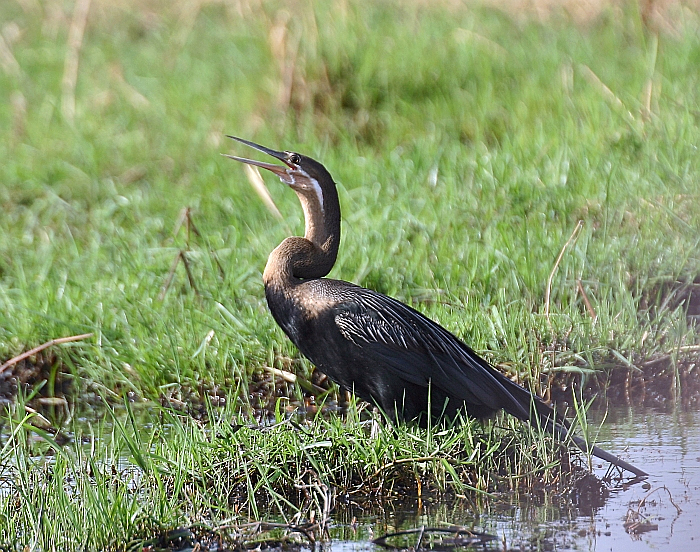
African darter

Order: Suliformes Family: Anhingidae

Anhingas or darters are often called "snake-birds" because of their long thin neck, which gives a snake-like appearance when they swim with their bodies submerged. The males have black and dark-brown plumage, an erectile crest on the nape, and a larger bill than the female. The females have much paler plumage especially on the neck and underparts. The darters have completely webbed feet and their legs are short and set far back on the body. Their plumage is somewhat permeable, like that of cormorants, and they spread their wings to dry after diving.

- African darter, Anhinga rufa (mbizi)

== Cormorants and shags ==
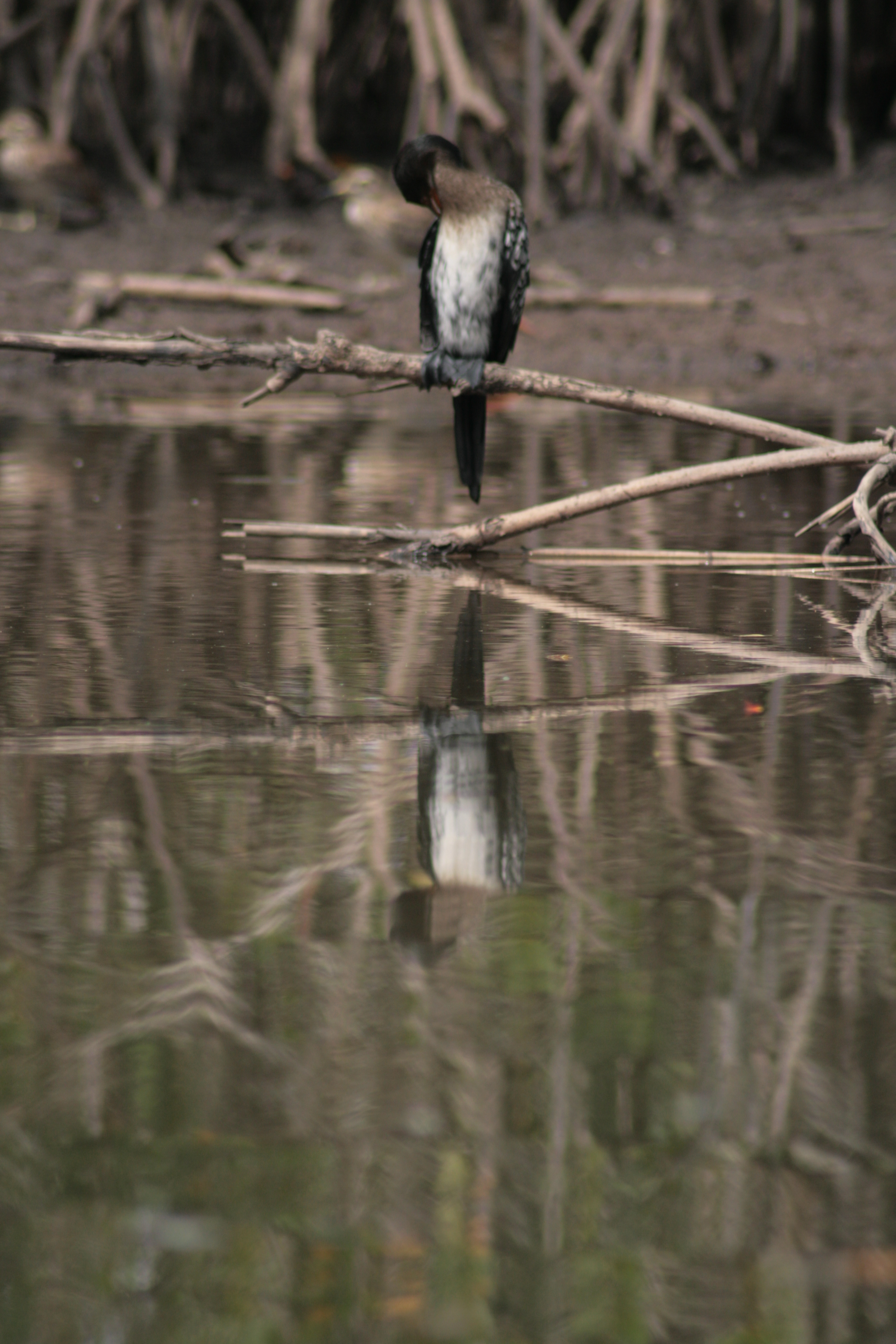
Long-tailed cormorant

Order: Suliformes Family: Phalacrocoracidae

Phalacrocoracidae is a family of medium to large coastal, fish-eating seabirds that includes cormorants and shags. Plumage coloration varies, with the majority having mainly dark plumage, some species being black-and-white, and a few being colorful.

- Long-tailed cormorant, Microcarbo africanus (mnandi mkia-mrefu)
- Great cormorant, Phalacrocorax carbo (mnandi kidari-cheupe)

== Pelicans ==
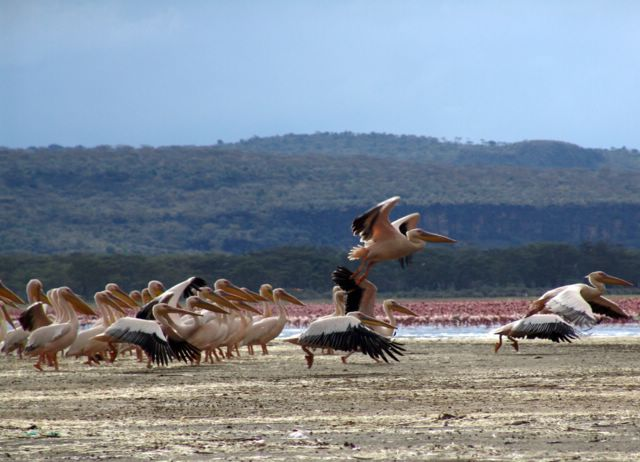
Great white pelicans at Lake Nakuru.

Order: Pelecaniformes Family: Pelecanidae

Pelicans are large water birds with a distinctive pouch under their beak. As with other members of the order Pelecaniformes, they have webbed feet with four toes.

- Great white pelican, Pelecanus onocrotalus (mwari mweupe)
- Pink-backed pelican, Pelecanus rufescens (mwari mgongo-pinki)

== Shoebill ==
Order: Pelecaniformes Family: Balaenicipididae

The shoebill was formerly thought to be related to storks but is in the same order as pelicans. It derives its name from its massive shoe-shaped bill.

- Shoebill, Balaeniceps rex (korongo-nyangumi) (A) (vulnerable)

== Hamerkop ==
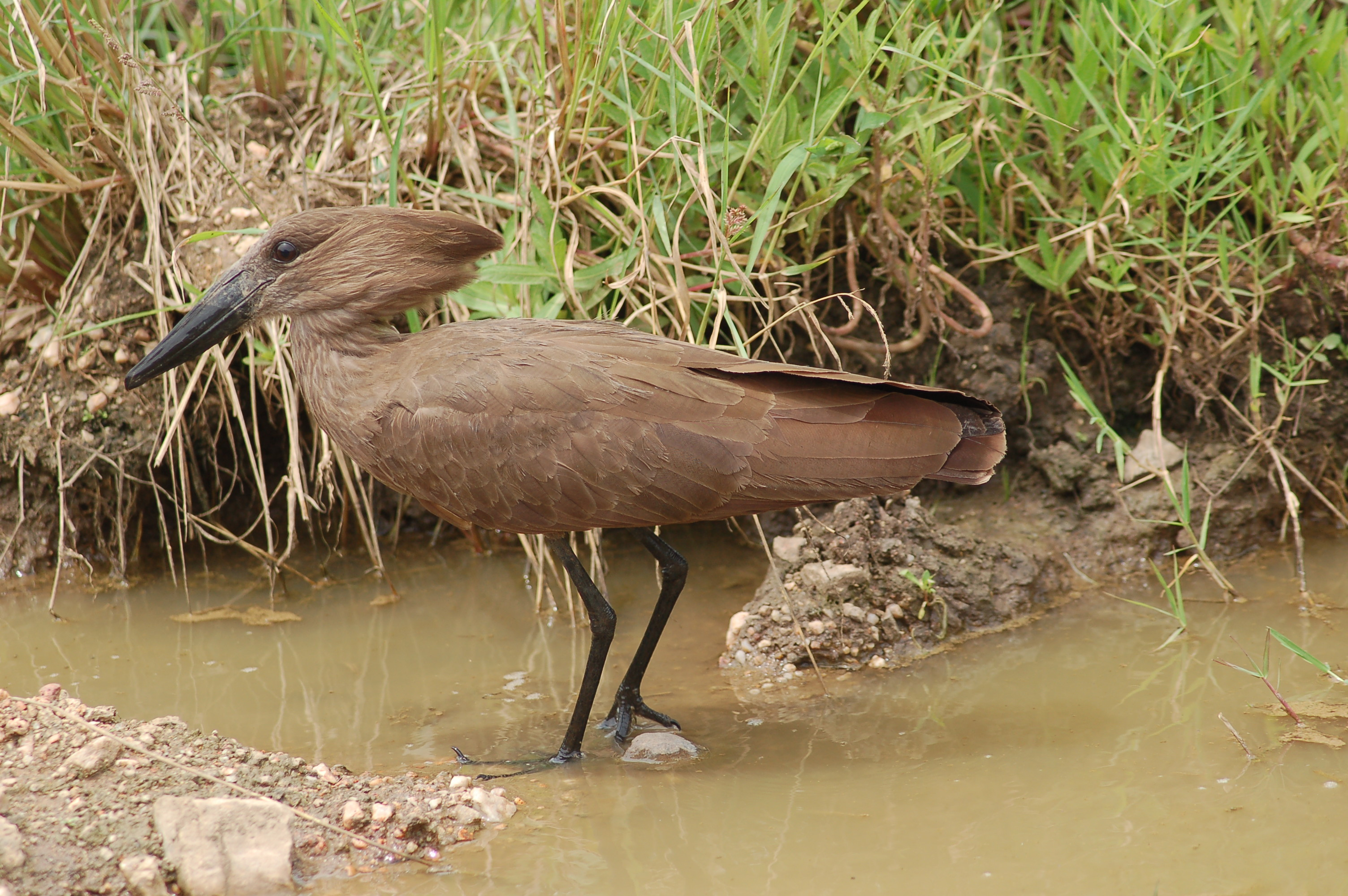
Hamerkop

Order: Pelecaniformes Family: Scopidae

The hamerkop is a medium-sized bird with a long shaggy crest. The shape of its head with a curved bill and crest at the back is reminiscent of a hammer, hence its name. Its plumage is drab-brown all over.

- Hamerkop, Scopus umbretta (msingwe)

== Herons, egrets, and bitterns ==
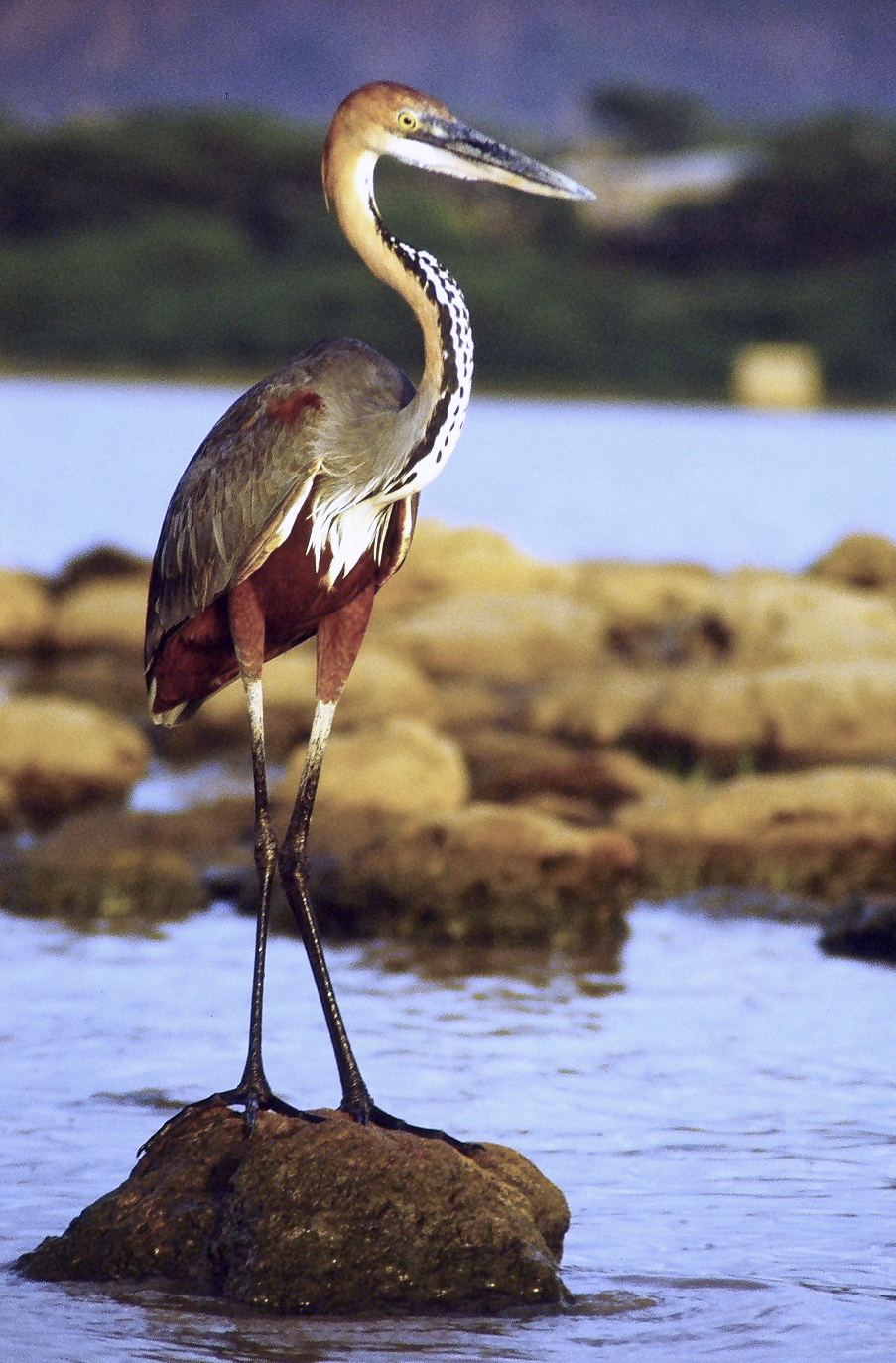
The Goliath heron, the biggest species of heron, is found on many large bodies of water in Kenya, this one at Lake Baringo.

Order: Pelecaniformes Family: Ardeidae

The family Ardeidae contains the bitterns, herons, and egrets. Herons and egrets are medium to large wading birds with long necks and legs. Bitterns tend to be shorter necked and more wary. Members of Ardeidae fly with their necks retracted, unlike other long-necked birds such as storks, ibises and spoonbills.

- Great bittern, Botaurus stellaris (vumatiti mkubwa) (A)
- Little bittern, Ixobrychus minutus (vumatiti mdogo)
- Dwarf bittern, Ixobrychus sturmii (vumatiti kibete)
- Gray heron, Ardea cinerea (koikoi kijivu)
- Black-headed heron, Ardea melanocephala (koikoi majoka)
- Goliath heron, Ardea goliath (pondagundi mkubwa)
- Purple heron, Ardea purpurea (pondagundi)
- Great egret, Ardea alba (msuka)
- Yellow-billed egret, Ardea brachyrhyncha (koikoi domo-njano)
- Cattle egret, Ardea ibis (yangeyange)
- Little egret, Egretta garzetta (dandala)
- Western reef-heron, Egretta gularis (yange koo-jeupe)
- Black heron, Egretta ardesiaca (yangeyange mweusi)
- Squacco heron, Ardeola ralloides (yangeyange njano)
- Malagasy pond-heron, Ardeola idae (yangeyange wa Madagaska) (endangered)
- Rufous-bellied heron, Ardeola rufiventris (yangeyange tumbo-jekundu)
- Striated heron, Butorides striata (ngojamalika)
- Black-crowned night-heron, Nycticorax nycticorax (kingoyo utosi-mweusi)
- White-backed night-heron, Calherodius leuconotus (kingoyo mgongo-mweupe)

== Ibises and spoonbills ==
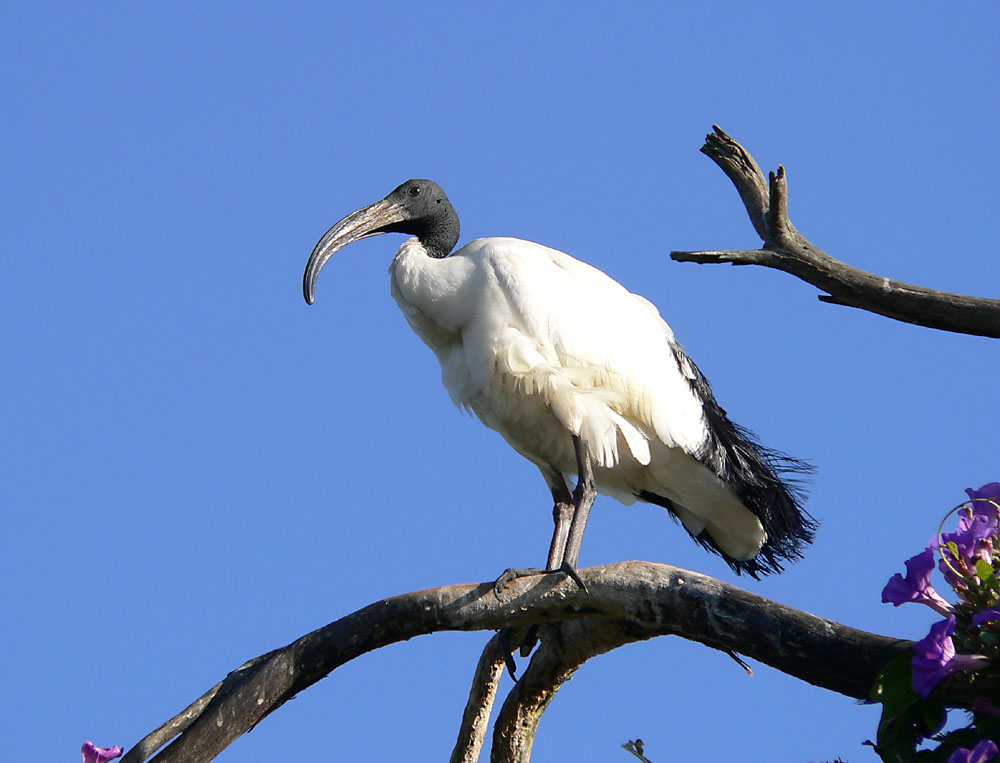
The African sacred ibis, shown here in Nanyuki, is widespread near water and even breeds in Nairobi.

Order: Pelecaniformes Family: Threskiornithidae

Threskiornithidae is a family of large terrestrial and wading birds which includes the ibises and spoonbills. They have long, broad wings with 11 primary and about 20 secondary feathers. They are strong fliers and despite their size and weight, very capable soarers.

- Glossy ibis, Plegadis falcinellus (kwarara mweusi)
- African sacred ibis, Threskiornis aethiopicus (kwarara shingo-nyeusi)
- Olive ibis, Bostrychia olivacea (kwarara kishungi)
- Hadada ibis, Bostrychia hagedash (kwarara hijani)
- Eurasian spoonbill, Platalea leucorodia (domomwiko wa Ulaya)
- African spoonbill, Platalea alba (domomwiko wa Afrika)

== Secretarybird ==
Order: Accipitriformes Family: Sagittariidae

The secretary-bird is a bird of prey but is easily distinguished from other raptors by its long crane-like legs.

- Secretarybird, Sagittarius serpentarius (karani tamba) (endangered)

== Osprey ==
Order: Accipitriformes Family: Pandionidae

The family Pandionidae contains only one species, the osprey. The osprey is a medium-large raptor which is a specialist fish-eater with a worldwide distribution.

- Osprey, Pandion haliaetus (koho)

== Hawks, eagles, and kites ==
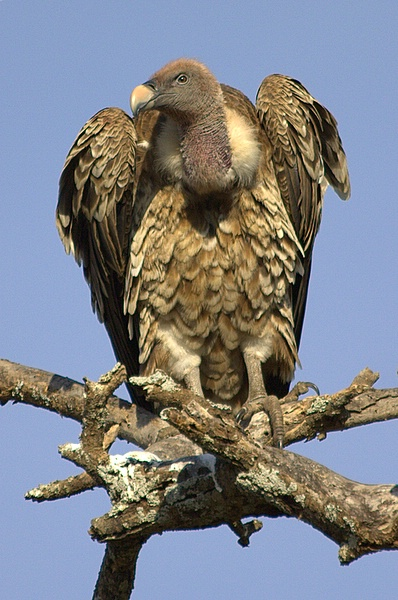
Rüppell's griffon

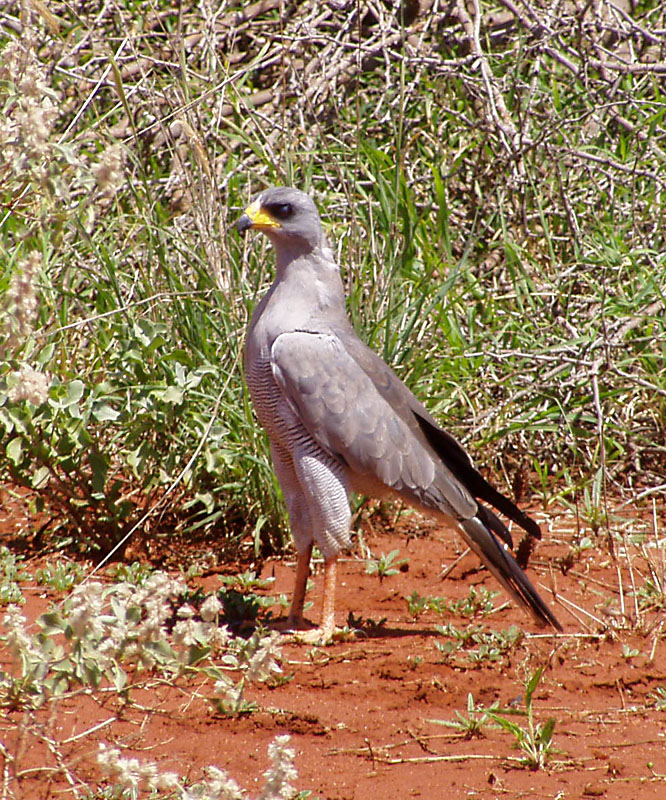
Eastern chanting-goshawk in Tsavo West National Park

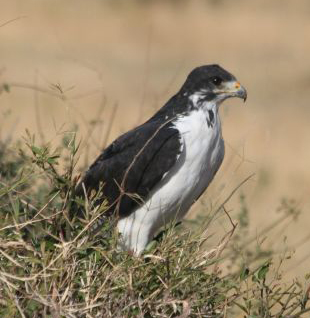
The augur buzzard or jackal buzzard is common in savannah, grassland, and mountain habitats.

Order: Accipitriformes Family: Accipitridae

Accipitridae is a family of birds of prey which includes hawks, eagles, kites, harriers, and Old World vultures. These birds have powerful hooked beaks for tearing flesh from their prey, strong legs, powerful talons, and keen eyesight.

- Black-winged kite, Elanus caeruleus (mwewe kipupwe)
- Scissor-tailed kite, Chelictinia riocourii (mwewe kizelele)
- African harrier-hawk, Polyboroides typus (hajivale wa Afrika)
- Palm-nut vulture, Gypohierax angolensis (tumbusi-miwese)
- Bearded vulture, Gypaetus barbatus (tumbusi mlakondoo) (near-threatened)
- Egyptian vulture, Neophron percnopterus (tumbusi uso-njano) (endangered)
- European honey-buzzard, Pernis apivorus (kengewa mlanyuki)
- Oriental honey-buzzard, Pernis ptilorhynchus (kengewa wa Asia) (A)
- African cuckoo-hawk, Aviceda cuculoides (kipanga-kikeo)
- White-headed vulture, Trigonoceps occipitalis (tumbusi kichwa-cheupe) (critically endangered)
- Lappet-faced vulture, Torgos tracheliotus (tumbusi ngusha) (endangered)
- Hooded vulture, Necrosyrtes monachus (tumbusi kapuchini) (critically endangered)
- White-backed vulture, Gyps africanus (tumbusi mgongo-mweupe) (critically endangered)
- Rüppell's griffon, Gyps rueppelli (tumbusi-mbuga) (critically endangered)
- Eurasian griffon, Gyps fulvus (tumbusi wa Ulaya) (A)
- Bateleur, Terathopius ecaudatus (pungu) (endangered)
- Short-toed snake-eagle, Circaetus gallicus (tai madole-mafupi) (A)
- Beaudouin's snake-eagle, Circaetus beaudouini (tai wa Beaudouin) (vulnerable)
- Black-chested snake-eagle, Circaetus pectoralis (tai kidari-cheusi)
- Brown snake-eagle, Circaetus cinereus (tai mlanyoka kahawia)
- Fasciated snake-eagle, Circaetus fasciolatus (tai miraba kusi) (near-threatened)
- Banded snake-eagle, Circaetus cinerascens (tai miraba magharibi)
- Bat hawk, Macheiramphus alcinus (kipanga mlapopo)
- Crowned eagle, Stephanoaetus coronatus (tai kumbakima) (near-threatened)
- Martial eagle, Polemaetus bellicosus (tai ngwilizi) (endangered)
- Long-crested eagle, Lophaetus occipitalis (tai ushungi)
- Lesser spotted eagle, Clanga pomarina (tai madoa)
- Greater spotted eagle, Clanga clanga (tai khangamadoa) (A) (vulnerable)
- Wahlberg's eagle, Hieraaetus wahlbergi (tai msafiri)
- Booted eagle, Hieraaetus pennatus (tai mabuti)
- Ayres's hawk-eagle, Hieraaetus ayresii (tai-misitu)
- Tawny eagle, Aquila rapax (tai msasi) (vulnerable)
- Steppe eagle, Aquila nipalensis (tai-nyika) (endangered)
- Imperial eagle, Aquila heliaca (tai kisogo-dhahabu) (vulnerable)
- Cassin's hawk-eagle, Aquila africana (tai wa Cassin) (A)
- Verreaux's eagle, Aquila verreauxii (tai nderi)
- African hawk-eagle, Aquila spilogaster (tai kumbamti)
- Lizard buzzard, Kaupifalco monogrammicus (shakivale mlamjusi)
- Dark chanting-goshawk, Melierax metabates (kizu domo-jekiundu)
- Eastern chanting-goshawk, Melierax poliopterus (kizu domo-njano)
- Gabar goshawk, Micronisus gabar (kizu miguu-myekundu)
- Grasshopper buzzard, Butastur rufipennis (shakivale mabawa-mekundu)
- Eurasian marsh-harrier, Circus aeruginosus (kipondya wanUlaya)
- African marsh-harrier, Circus ranivorus (kipondya wa Afrika)
- Pallid harrier, Circus macrourus (kipondya kijivu) (near-threatened)
- Montagu's harrier, Circus pygargus (kipondya wa Montagu)
- African goshawk, Accipiter tachiro (senga)
- Shikra, Accipiter badius (kitaroharo)
- Levant sparrowhawk, Accipiter brevipes (kipanga miguu-mifupi) (A)
- Little sparrowhawk, Accipiter minullus (kipanga mdogo)
- Ovambo sparrowhawk, Accipiter ovampensis (kipanga wa Ovambo)
- Eurasian sparrowhawk, Accipiter nisus (kipanga wa Eurasia) (A)
- Rufous-breasted sparrowhawk, Accipiter rufiventris (kipanga tumbo-jekundu)
- Black goshawk, Astur melanoleucus (kipanga mweusi)
- Black kite, Milvus migrans (mwewe domo-jeusi)
- African fish-eagle, Icthyophaga vocifer (furukombe)
- Common buzzard, Buteo buteo (shakivale wa Eurasia)
- Mountain buzzard, Buteo oreophilus (shakivale-milima) (near-threatened)
- Long-legged buzzard, Buteo rufinus (kipanga miguu-mirefu)
- Augur buzzard, Buteo augur (shakivale tumbo-jeupe)

== Barn-owls ==
Order: Strigiformes Family: Tytonidae

Barn-owls are medium to large owls with large heads and characteristic heart-shaped faces. They have long strong legs with powerful talons.

- African grass-owl, Tyto capensis (bundi-mbuga)
- Western barn owl, Tyto alba (bundi-banda)

== Owls ==
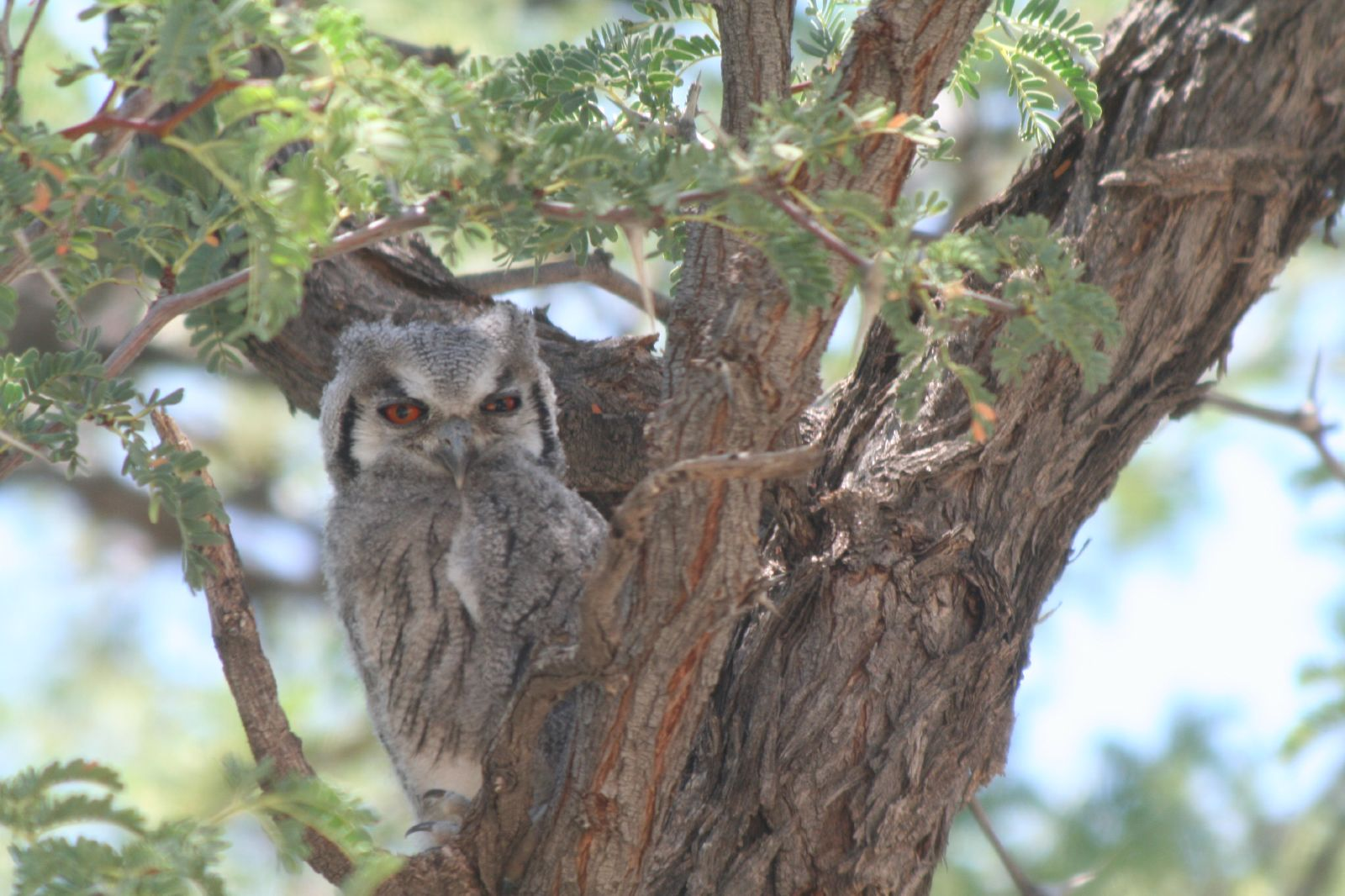
The southern white-faced owl is rare in dry areas of southern Kenya.

Order: Strigiformes Family: Strigidae

The typical owls are small to large solitary nocturnal birds of prey. They have large forward-facing eyes and ears, a hawk-like beak, and a conspicuous circle of feathers around each eye called a facial disk.

- Sokoke scops-owl, Otus ireneae (mtiti wa Sokoke) (endangered)
- Eurasian scops-owl, Otus scops (mtiti wa Eurasia)
- African scops-owl, Otus senegalensis (mtiti wa Afrika)
- Northern white-faced owl, Ptilopsis leucotis (mtiti uso-mweupe kaskazi)
- Southern white-faced owl, Ptilopsis granti (mtiti uso-mweupe kusi)
- Cape eagle-owl, Bubo capensis (kungwi kusi)
- Spotted eagle-owl, Bubo africanus (kungwi madoa)
- Grayish eagle-owl, Bubo cinerascens (kungwi kijivu)
- Verreaux's eagle-owl, Bubo lacteus (kokoko)
- Pel's fishing-owl, Scotopelia peli (kokoko-mlasamaki madoa)
- Pearl-spotted owlet, Glaucidium perlatum (kitaumande madoa)
- Red-chested owlet, Glaucidium tephronotum (kitaumande kidari-chekundu)
- African barred owlet, Glaucidium capense (kitaumande miraba)
- African wood-owl, Strix woodfordii (bundi-misitu)
- Abyssinian owl, Asio abyssinicus (bundi masikio-marefu)
- Short-eared owl, Asio flammeus (bundi masikio-mafupi) (A)
- Marsh owl, Asio capensis (bundi-maji)

== Mousebirds ==
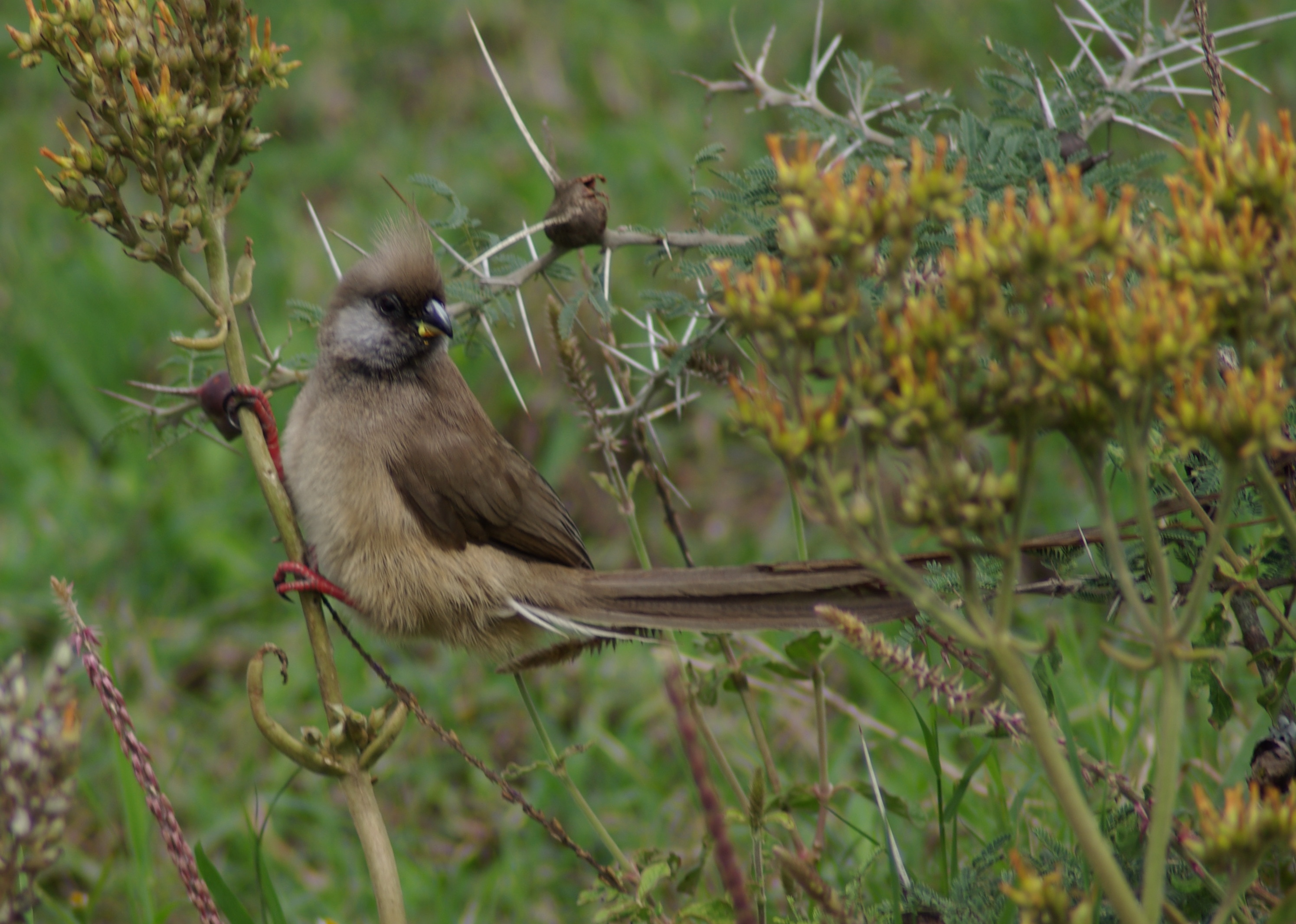
The speckled mousebird is common in many habitats, in this case Sweetwaters Tented Camp.

Order: Coliiformes Family: Coliidae

The mousebirds are slender grayish or brown birds with soft, hairlike body feathers and very long thin tails. They are arboreal and scurry through the leaves like rodents in search of berries, fruit, and buds. They are acrobatic and can feed upside down. All species have strong claws and reversible outer toes. They also have crests and stubby bills.

- Speckled mousebird, Colius striatus (kuzumburu michirizi)
- White-headed mousebird, Colius leucocephalus (kuzumburu kichwa-cheupe)
- Blue-naped mousebird, Urocolius macrourus (kuzumburu kisogo-buluu)

== Trogons ==
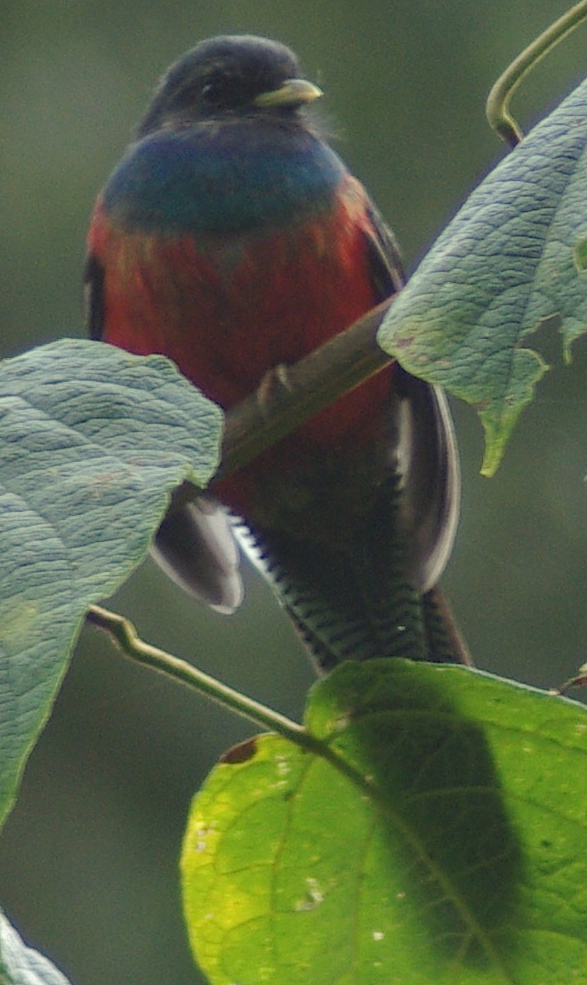
Bar-tailed trogon near Mountain Lodge

Order: Trogoniformes Family: Trogonidae

The family Trogonidae includes trogons and quetzals. Found in tropical woodlands worldwide, they feed on insects and fruit, and their broad bills and weak legs reflect their diet and arboreal habits. Although their flight is fast, they are reluctant to fly any distance. Trogons have soft, often colorful, feathers with distinctive male and female plumage.

- Narina trogon, Apaloderma narina (lukungu wa kawaida)
- Bar-tailed trogon, Apaloderma vittatum (lukungu mkia-miraba)

== Hoopoes ==
Order: Bucerotiformes Family: Upupidae

Hoopoes have black, white, and orangey-pink coloring with a large erectile crest on their head.

- Eurasian hoopoe, Upupa epops (hudihudi)

== Woodhoopoes and scimitarbills ==
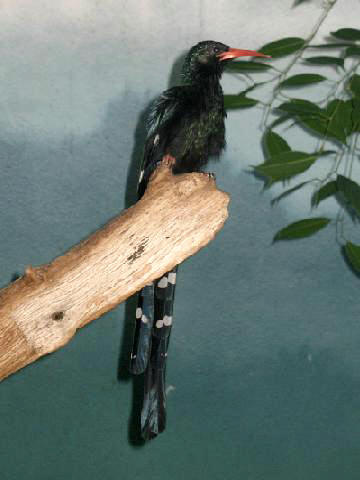
Green woodhoopoe

Order: Bucerotiformes Family: Phoeniculidae

The woodhoopoes and scimitarbills are related to the hoopoes, ground-hornbills, and hornbills. They most resemble the hoopoes with their long curved bills, used to probe for insects, and short rounded wings. However, they differ in that they have metallic plumage, often blue, green, or purple, and lack an erectile crest.

- Green woodhoopoe, Phoeniculus purpureus (goregore kijani)
- Violet woodhoopoe, Phoeniculus damarensis (goregore zambarau)
- Black-billed woodhoopoe, Phoeniculus somaliensis (goregore domo-jeusi)
- White-headed woodhoopoe, Phoeniculus bollei (goregore kichwa-cheupe)
- Common scimitarbill, Rhinopomastus cyanomelas (domomundu domo-jeusi)
- Abyssinian scimitarbill, Rhinopomastus minor (domomundu domo-jekundu)

== Ground-hornbills ==
Order: Bucerotiformes Family: Bucorvidae

The ground-hornbills are terrestrial birds which feed almost entirely on insects, other birds, snakes, and amphibians.

- Abyssinian ground-hornbill, Bucorvus abyssinicus (mumbi kasakzai) (vulnerable)
- Southern ground-hornbill, Bucorvus leadbeateri (mumbi kusi) (vulnerable)

== Hornbills ==
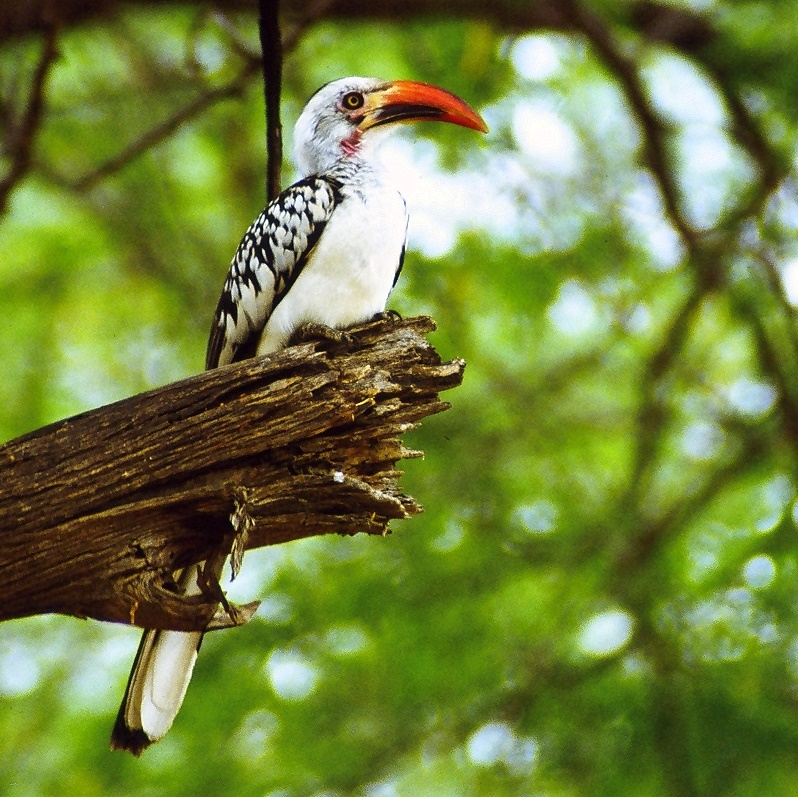
The northern red-billed hornbill inspired the character Zazu in The Lion King. This one was photographed at Lake Baringo.

Order: Bucerotiformes Family: Bucerotidae

Hornbills are a group of birds whose bill is shaped like a cow's horn, but without a twist, sometimes with a casque on the upper mandible. Frequently, the bill is brightly colored.

- Crowned hornbill, Lophoceros alboterminatus (kwembekwembe)
- Hemprich's hornbill, Lophoceros hemprichii (fimbi wa Hemprich)
- African gray hornbill, Lophoceros nasutus (fimbi mweusi)
- Eastern yellow-billed hornbill, Tockus flavirostris (fimbi domo-njano mashariki)
- Jackson's hornbill, Tockus jacksoni (fimbi wa Jackson)
- Von der Decken's hornbill, Tockus deckeni (fimbi wa Decken)
- Northern red-billed hornbill, Tockus erythrorhynchus (fimbi domo-jekundu kaskazi)
- Silvery-cheeked hornbill, Bycanistes brevis (hondohondo kijivu)
- Black-and-white-casqued hornbill, Bycanistes subcylindricus (hondohondo rangi-mbili)
- Trumpeter hornbill, Bycanistes bucinator (hondohondo tarumbeta)

== Kingfishers ==
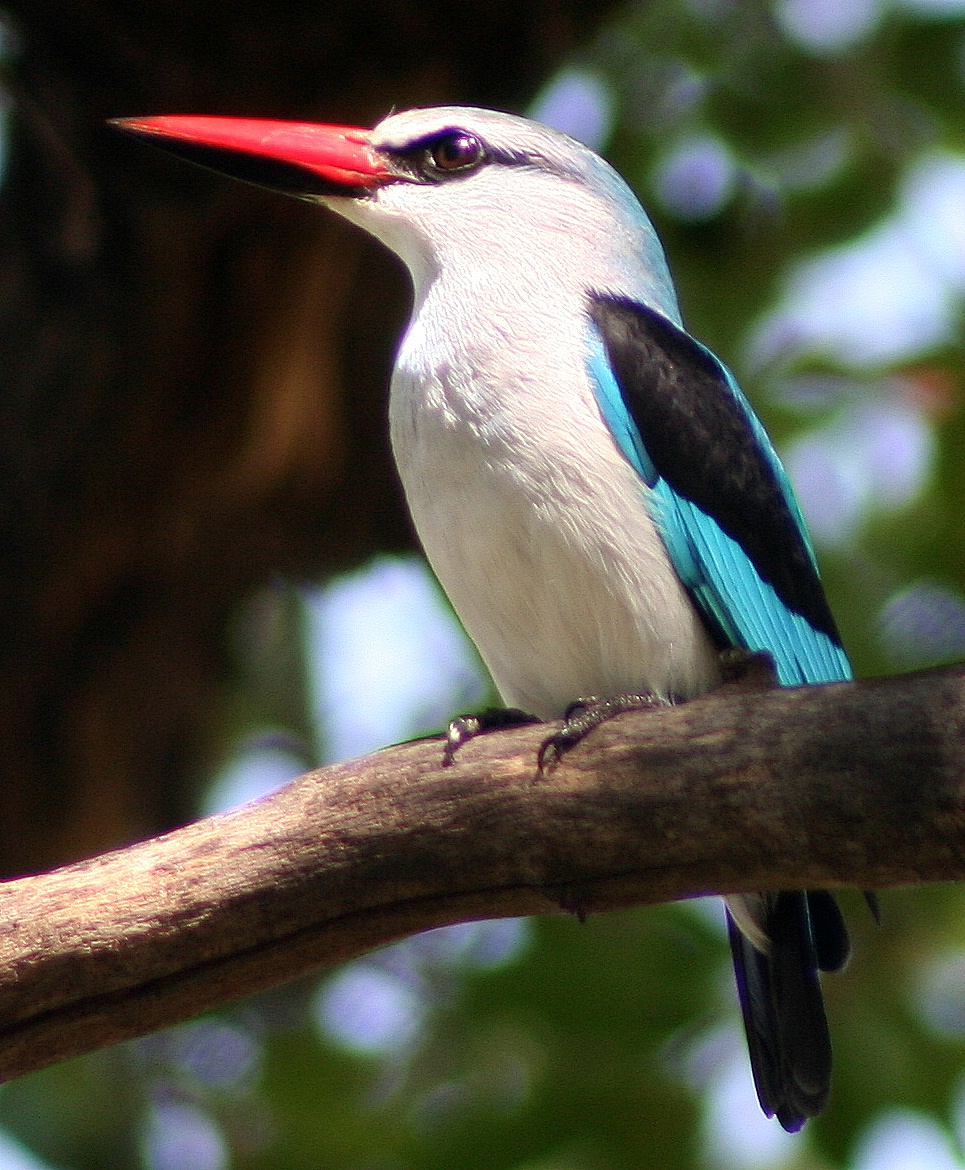
One subspecies of the woodland kingfisher breeds in Kenya; another (shown) breeds in southern Africa and spends the austral winter as far north as the Turkwel River.

Order: Coraciiformes Family: Alcedinidae

Kingfishers are medium-sized birds with large heads, long, pointed bills, short legs, and stubby tails.

- Half-collared kingfisher, Alcedo semitorquata (mdiria ukosi-buluu)
- Shining-blue kingfisher, Alcedo quadribrachys (mdiria buluu)
- Malachite kingfisher, Corythornis cristatus (kizamiadagaa)
- African pygmy kingfisher, Ispidina picta (kisharifu)
- Gray-headed kingfisher, Halcyon leucocephala (kurea tumbo-jekundu)
- Woodland kingfisher, Halcyon senegalensis (kurea kidari-kijivu)
- Mangrove kingfisher, Halcyon senegaloides (kijimbi-msitu)
- Blue-breasted kingfisher, Halcyon malimbica (kurea kidari-buluu) (A)
- Brown-hooded kingfisher, Halcyon albiventris (kurea kichwa-kahawia)
- Striped kingfisher, Halcyon chelicuti (kichi)
- Collared kingfisher, Todiramphus chloris (kurea mkufu-mweupe)
- Giant kingfisher, Megaceryle maxima (mkumburu)
- Pied kingfisher, Ceryle rudis (detepwani)

== Bee-eaters ==
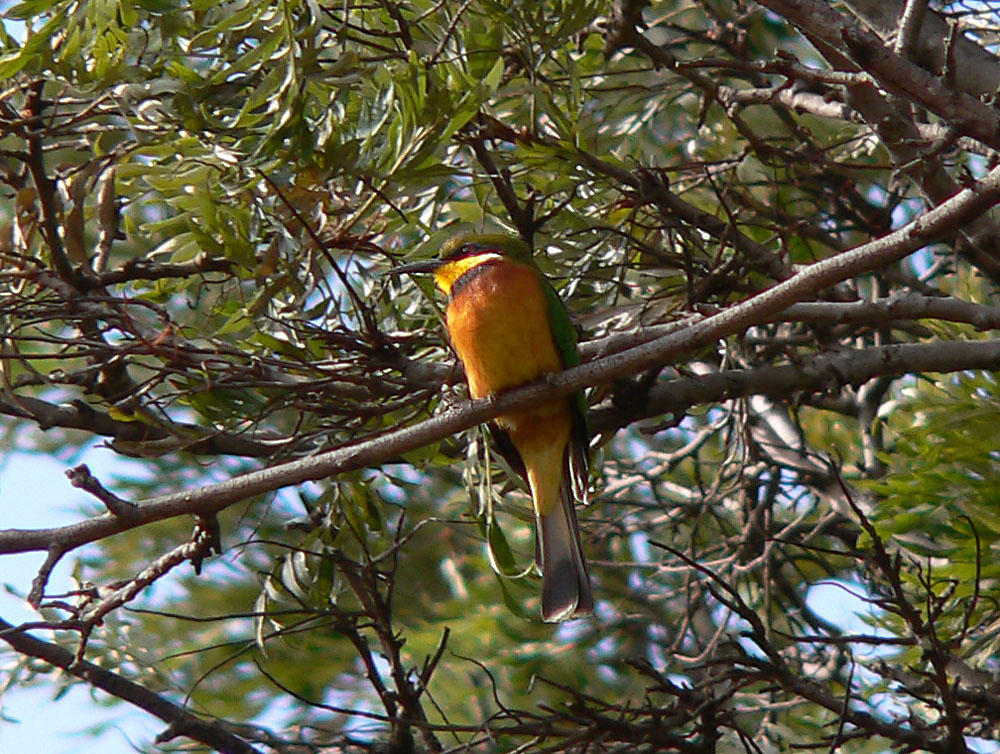
This cinnamon-chested bee-eater, a highland species, was photographed at Nanyuki.

Order: Coraciiformes Family: Meropidae

The bee-eaters are a group of near passerine birds in the family Meropidae. Most species are found in Africa but others occur in southern Europe, Madagascar, Australia, and New Guinea. They are characterised by richly colored plumage, slender bodies, and usually elongated central tail feathers. All have long down-turned bills and pointed wings, which give them a swallow-like appearance when seen from afar.

- Blue-headed bee-eater, Merops muelleri (kerem kichwa-buluu)
- White-fronted bee-eater, Merops bullockoides (kerem paji-jeupe)
- Little bee-eater, Merops pusillus (kerem mdogo)
- Blue-breasted bee-eater, Merops variegatus (kerem mkufu-buluu)
- Ethiopian bee-eater, Merops lafresnayii (kerem Habeshi) (A)
- Cinnamon-chested bee-eater, Merops oreobates (kerem kidari-marungi)
- Swallow-tailed bee-eater, Merops hirundineus (keremberere) (A)
- Somali bee-eater, Merops revoilii (kerem Somali)
- White-throated bee-eater, Merops albicollis (kerem koo-jeupe)
- Böhm's bee-eater, Merops boehmi (kerem wa Böhm) (A)
- Blue-cheeked bee-eater, Merops persicus (kerem mashavu-buluu)
- Madagascar bee-eater, Merops superciliosus (kerem kiole)
- European bee-eater, Merops apiaster (kerem wa Ulaya)
- Northern carmine bee-eater, Merops nubicus (kondekonde kaskazi)
- Southern carmine bee-eater, Merops nubicoides (kondekonde kusi) (A)

== Rollers ==
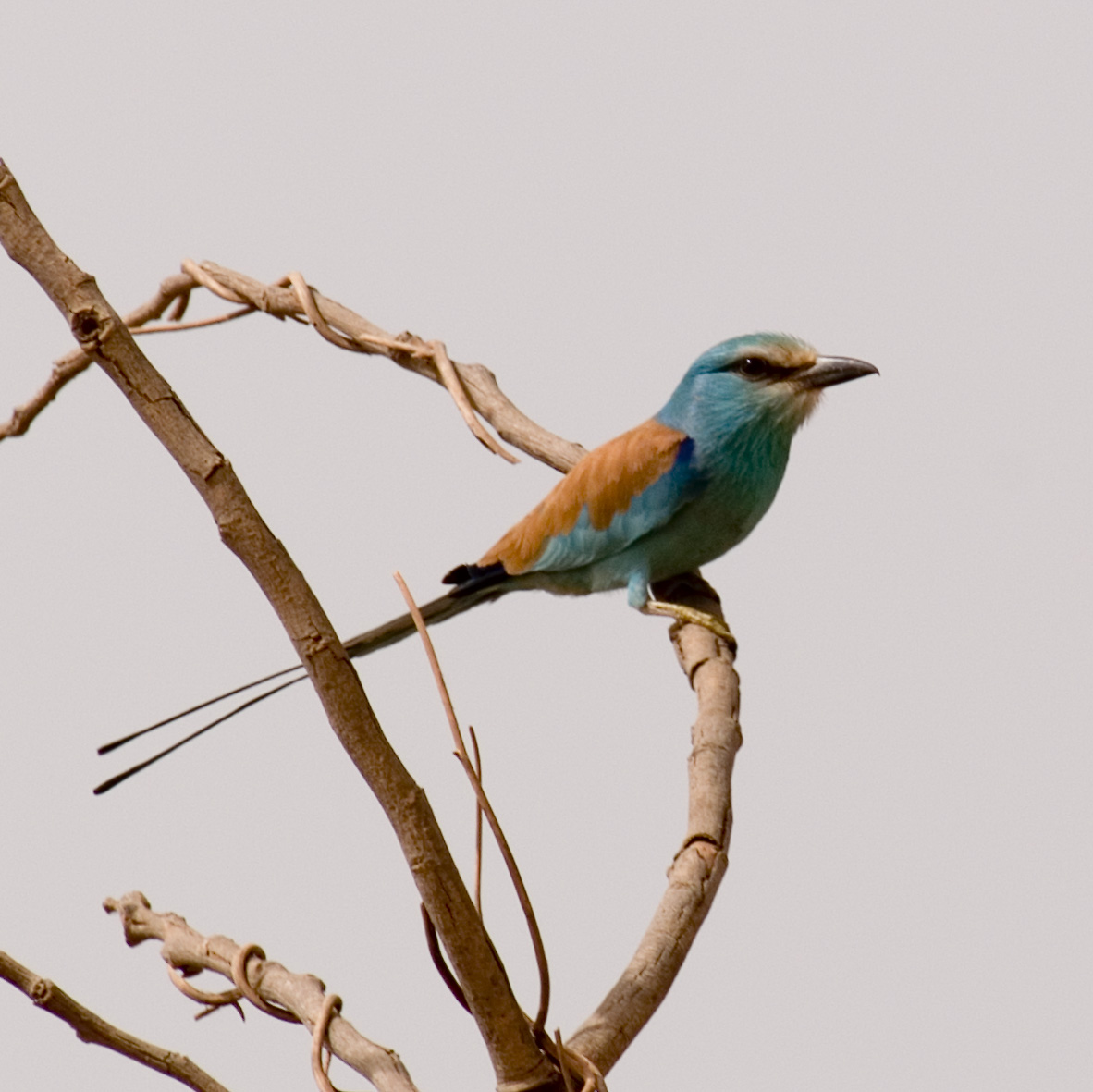
The Abyssinian roller occurs in dry regions in the north of the country, wandering south at times.

Order: Coraciiformes Family: Coraciidae

Rollers resemble crows in size and build, but are more closely related to the kingfishers and bee-eaters. They share the colorful appearance of those groups with blues and browns predominating. The two inner front toes are connected, but the outer toe is not.

- European roller, Coracias garrulus (kiogajivu wa Ulaya)
- Abyssinian roller, Coracias abyssinicus (kiogajivu Habeshi)
- Lilac-breasted roller, Coracias caudatus (kiogajivu kidari-zambarau)
- Racket-tailed roller, Coracias spatulatus (kiogajivu mkia-rungu) (A)
- Rufous-crowned roller, Coracias naevius (kiogajivu kichwa-marungi)
- Broad-billed roller, Eurystomus glaucurus (jore-mbuga)

== African barbets ==
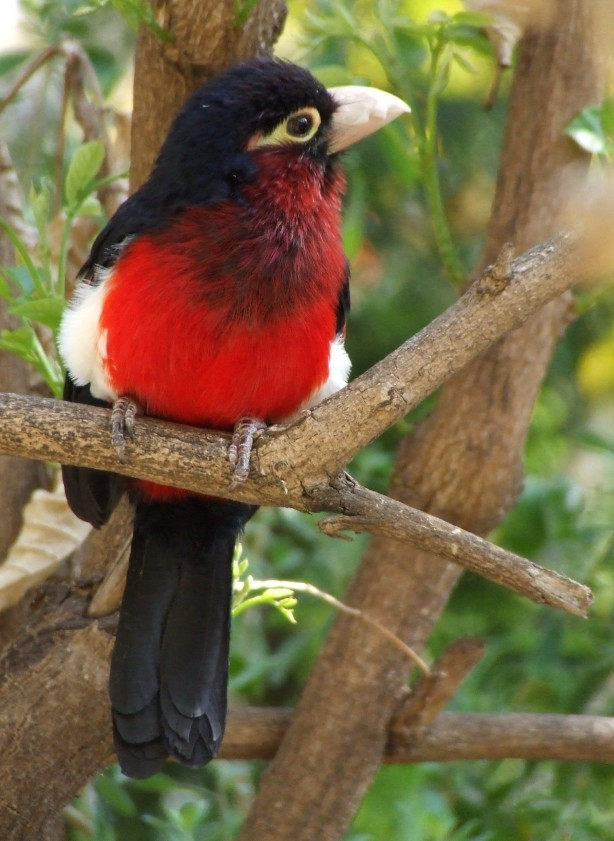
Double-toothed barbet

Order: Piciformes Family: Lybiidae

The barbets are plump birds, with short necks and large heads. They get their name from the bristles which fringe their heavy bills. Most species are brightly colored.

- Eastern yellow-billed barbet, Trachylaemus purpuratus (zuwakulu domo-njano)
- Red-and-yellow barbet, Trachyphonus erythrocephalus (zuwakulu kisigajiru)
- D'Arnaud's barbet, Trachyphonus darnaudii (zuwakulu madoa-njano)
- Gray-throated barbet, Gymnobucco bonapartei (zuwakulu koo-jeupe)
- White-eared barbet, Stactolaema leucotis (zuwakulu masikiko-meupe)
- Green barbet, Stactolaema olivacea (zuwakulu kijani)
- Green tinkerbird, Pogoniulus simplex (kitororo kijani)
- Moustached tinkerbird, Pogoniulus leucomystax (kitororo masharubu)
- Yellow-rumped tinkerbird, Pogoniulus bilineatus (kitororo kiuno-njano)
- Red-fronted tinkerbird, Pogoniulus pusillus (zuwakulu paji-jekundu)
- Yellow-fronted tinkerbird, Pogoniulus chrysoconus (zuwakulu paji-njano)
- Yellow-spotted barbet, Buccanodon duchaillui (zuwakulu utosi-mwekundu)
- Hairy-breasted barbet, Tricholaema hirsuta (zuwakulu kidari-nywele)
- Red-fronted barbet, Tricholaema diademata (zuwakulu paji-jekundu)
- Spot-flanked barbet, Tricholaema lachrymosa (zuwakulu madoa-meusi)
- Black-throated barbet, Tricholaema melanocephala (zuwakulu koo-jeusi)
- White-headed barbet, Lybius leucocephalus (zuwakulu kichwa-cheupe)
- Black-billed barbet, Lybius guifsobalito (zuwakulu domo-jeusi)
- Black-collared barbet, Lybius torquatus (zuwakulu shingo-nyeusi)
- Brown-breasted barbet, Lybius melanopterus (zuwakulu kidari-marungi)
- Double-toothed barbet, Lybius bidentatus (zuwakulu domo-kuu)

== Honeyguides ==
Order: Piciformes Family: Indicatoridae

Honeyguides are among the few birds that feed on wax. They are named for the greater honeyguide which leads traditional honey-hunters to bees' nests and, after the hunters have harvested the honey, feeds on the remaining contents of the hive.

- Cassin's honeyguide, Prodotiscus insignis (mlembe domo-jembamba)
- Green-backed honeyguide, Prodotiscus zambesiae (mlembe mgongo-kijani)
- Wahlberg's honeyguide, Prodotiscus regulus (mlembe mgongo-kahawia)
- Pallid honeyguide, Indicator meliphilus (kiongozi-misitu)
- Least honeyguide, Indicator exilis (kiongozi-kuya)
- Lesser honeyguide, Indicator minor (kiongozi mdogo)
- Scaly-throated honeyguide, Indicator variegatus (kiongozi mabaka)
- Greater honeyguide, Indicator indicator (kiongozi mkubwa)

== Woodpeckers ==
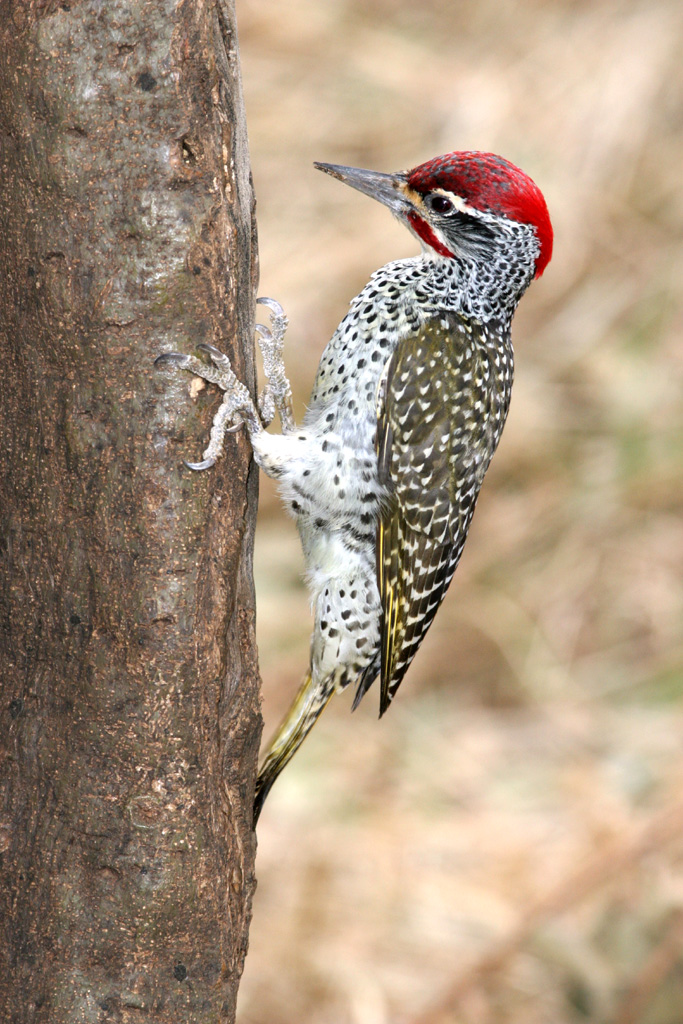
This Nubian woodpecker was photographed at Samburu National Reserve.

Order: Piciformes Family: Picidae

Woodpeckers are small to medium-sized birds with chisel-like beaks, short legs, stiff tails, and long tongues used for capturing insects. Some species have feet with two toes pointing forward and two backward, while several species have only three toes. Many woodpeckers have the habit of tapping noisily on tree trunks with their beaks.

- Eurasian wryneck, Jynx torquilla (kiseleagofu wa Eurasia) (A)
- Rufous-necked wryneck, Jynx ruficollis (kiselegofu koo-jekundu)
- Speckle-breasted woodpecker, Chloropicus poecilolaemus (kigong'ota kidari-madoa)
- Cardinal woodpecker, Chloropicus fuscescens (kigong'ota mgongo-miraba)
- Bearded woodpecker, Chloropicus namaquus (kigong'ota kidevu-cheusi)
- Golden-crowned woodpecker, Chloropicus xantholophus (kigong'ota kishungi-njano)
- Brown-backed woodpecker, Chloropicus obsoletus (kigong'ota mgongo-mwekundu)
- African gray woodpecker, Dendropicos goertae (kigong'ota kijivu)
- Mountain gray woodpecker, Dendropicos spodocephalus (kigong'ota kichwa-kijivu)
- Brown-eared woodpecker, Campethera caroli (kigong'ota masikio-kahawia)
- Buff-spotted woodpecker, Campethera nivosa (kigong'ota kisogo-chekundu)
- Tullberg's woodpecker, Campethera tullbergi (gongonola)
- Green-backed woodpecker, Campethera cailliautii (kigong'ota mgongo-kijani)
- Nubian woodpecker, Campethera nubica (kigong'ota Nubi)
- Bennett's woodpecker, Campethera bennettii (kigong'ota masharubu-mekundu) (A)
- Reichenow's woodpecker, Campethera scriptoricauda (kigong'ota vipaku) (A)
- Golden-tailed woodpecker, Campethera abingoni (kigong'ota mkia-njano)
- Mombasa woodpecker, Campethera mombassica (kigong'ota wa Mombasa)

== Falcons and caracaras ==
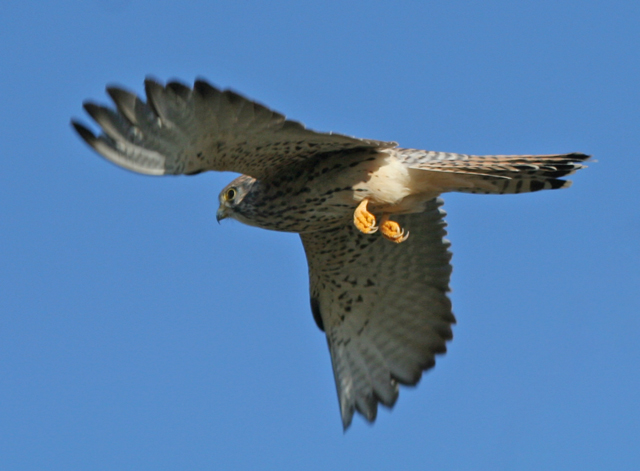
The lesser kestrel is a locally common winter visitor from Europe and Asia.

Order: Falconiformes Family: Falconidae

Falconidae is a family of diurnal birds of prey. They differ from hawks, eagles, and kites in that they kill with their beaks instead of their talons.

- Pygmy falcon, Polihierax semitorquatus (kozi kibete)
- Lesser kestrel, Falco naumanni (kozi mdogo)
- Eurasian kestrel, Falco tinnunculus (kozi kichwa-kijivu)
- Rock kestrel, Falco rupicolus (kozi-miamba)
- Greater kestrel, Falco rupicoloides (kozi macho-meupe)
- Fox kestrel, Falco alopex (kozi mwekundu)
- Gray kestrel, Falco ardosiaceus (kozi kijivu)
- Dickinson's kestrel, Falco dickinsoni (kozi kiuno-cheupe)
- Red-necked falcon, Falco chicquera (kozi kisogo-chekundu)
- Red-footed falcon, Falco vespertinus (kozi miguu-myekundu) (near-threatened)
- Amur falcon, Falco amurensis (kozi wa Amur)
- Eleonora's falcon, Falco eleonorae (kozi wa Eleonora)
- Sooty falcon, Falco concolor (kozi mweusi) (vulnerable)
- Eurasian hobby, Falco subbuteo (kozi wa Ulaya)
- African hobby, Falco cuvierii (kozi mlake)
- Lanner falcon, Falco biarmicus (kozi marumbi)
- Saker falcon, Falco cherrug (kozi madoa) (endangered)
- Peregrine falcon, Falco peregrinus (kozi tembere)
- Taita falcon, Falco fasciinucha (kozi wa Taita) (vulnerable)

== Old World parrots ==
Order: Psittaciformes Family: Psittaculidae

Characteristic features of parrots include a strong curved bill, an upright stance, strong legs, and clawed zygodactyl feet. Many parrots are vividly colored, and some are multi-colored. In size they range from 8 cm (3.1 in) to 1 m (3.3 ft) in length. Old World parrots are found from Africa east across south and southeast Asia and Oceania to Australia and New Zealand.

- Gray-headed lovebird, Agapornis canus (cherero kichwa-kijivu) (I)
- Red-headed lovebird, Agapornis pullarius (cherero uso-mwekundu)
- Fischer's lovebird, Agapornis fischeri (cherero kichwa-machungwa) (near-threatened)
- Yellow-collared lovebird, Agapornis personatus (cherero shingo-njano) (I)

== African and New World parrots ==
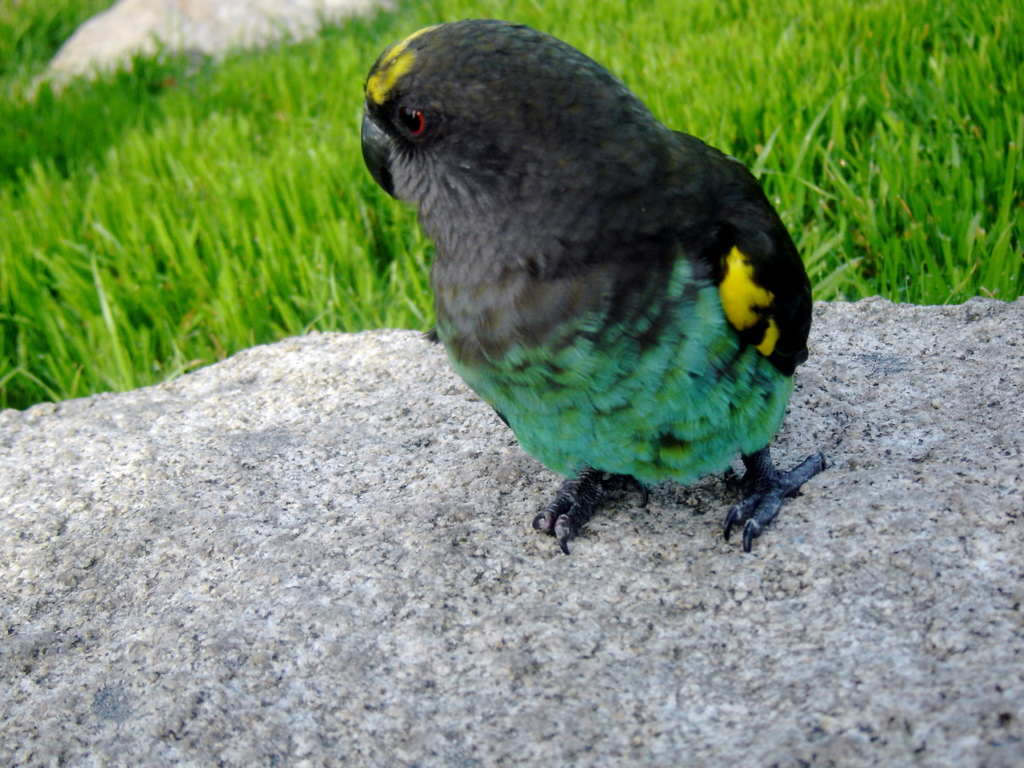
Meyer's parrot

Order: Psittaciformes Family: Psittacidae

Characteristic features of parrots include a strong curved bill, an upright stance, strong legs, and clawed zygodactyl feet. Many parrots are vividly colored, and some are multi-colored. In size they range from 8 cm (3.1 in) to 1 m (3.3 ft) in length. Most of the more than 150 species in this family are found in the New World.

- Grey parrot, Psittacus erithacus (kasuku mkia-mwekundu)
- Red-fronted parrot, Poicephalus gulielmi (kwao paji-jekundu)
- Meyer's parrot, Poicephalus meyeri (kwao mabega-njano)
- Brown-headed parrot, Poicephalus cryptoxanthus (kwao kichwa-kahawia)
- Red-bellied parrot, Poicephalus rufiventris (kwao tumbo-jekundu)

== African and green broadbills ==
Order: Passeriformes Family: Calyptomenidae

The broadbills are small, brightly colored birds which feed on fruit and also take insects in flycatcher fashion, snapping their broad bills. Their habitat is canopies of wet forests.

- African broadbill, Smithornis capensis (kijogoo-shamba)

== Pittas ==
Order: Passeriformes Family: Pittidae

Pittas are medium-sized by passerine standards and are stocky, with fairly long, strong legs, short tails, and stout bills. Many are brightly colored. They spend the majority of their time on wet forest floors, eating snails, insects, and similar invertebrates.

- African pitta, Pitta angolensis (hinabuluu)

== Cuckooshrikes ==
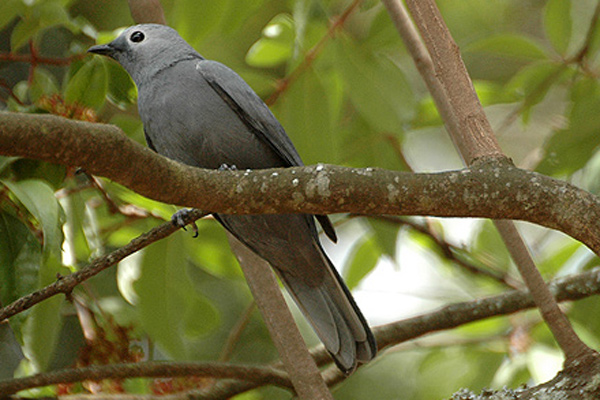
Gray cuckooshrike

Order: Passeriformes Family: Campephagidae

The cuckooshrikes are small to medium-sized passerine birds. They are predominantly grayish with white and black, although some species are brightly colored.

- Gray cuckooshrike, Ceblepyris caesius (gude kijivu)
- White-breasted cuckooshrike, Coracina pectoralis (gude kidari-cheupe)
- Black cuckooshrike, Campephaga flava (gude mweusi)
- Petit's cuckooshrike, Campephaga petiti (gude wa Petit)
- Red-shouldered cuckooshrike, Campephaga phoenicea (gude mabega-mekundu)
- Purple-throated cuckooshrike, Campephaga quiscalina (gude koo-zambarau)

== Old World orioles ==
Order: Passeriformes Family: Oriolidae

The Old World orioles are colorful passerine birds which are not related to the similar-looking New World orioles.

- Eurasian golden oriole, Oriolus oriolus (kubwilu wa Eurasia)
- African golden oriole, Oriolus auratus (kubwilu manjano)
- Green-headed oriole, Oriolus chlorocephalus (kubwilu kichwa-kijani)
- Western black-headed oriole, Oriolus brachyrynchus (kubwilu domo-fupi)
- African black-headed oriole, Oriolus larvatus (kubwilu kichwa-cheusi)
- Black-tailed oriole, Oriolus percivali (kubwilu-milima)

== Wattle-eyes and batises ==
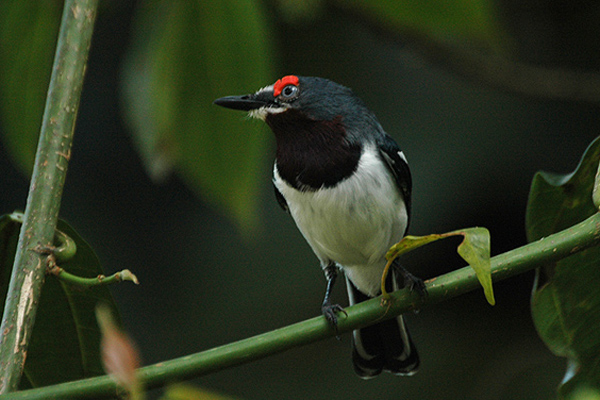
A female brown-throated wattle-eye

Order: Passeriformes Family: Platysteiridae

The wattle-eyes, or puffback flycatchers, are small stout passerine birds of the African tropics. They get their name from the brightly colored fleshy eye decorations found in most species in this group.

- Brown-throated wattle-eye, Platysteira cyanea (bwiru koo-kahawia)
- Black-throated wattle-eye, Platysteira peltata (bwiru koo-jeusi)
- Chestnut wattle-eye, Platysteira castanea (bwiru mwekundu)
- Jameson's wattle-eye, Platysteira jamesoni (bwiru wa Jameson)
- Yellow-bellied wattle-eye, Platysteira concreta (bwiru tumbo-njano)
- Short-tailed batis, Batis mixta (tatata mkia-mfupi)
- Chinspot batis, Batis molitor (tatata mbavu-nyeupe)
- Pale batis, Batis soror (tatata-pwani)
- Gray-headed batis, Batis orientalis (tatata utosi-kijivu`) (A)
- Western black-headed batis, Batis erlangeri (tatata kichwa-cheusi magharibi)
- Eastern black-headed batis, Batis minor (tatata kichwa-cheusi mashariki)
- Pygmy batis, Batis perkeo (tatata mdogo)

== Vangas, helmetshrikes, and allies ==
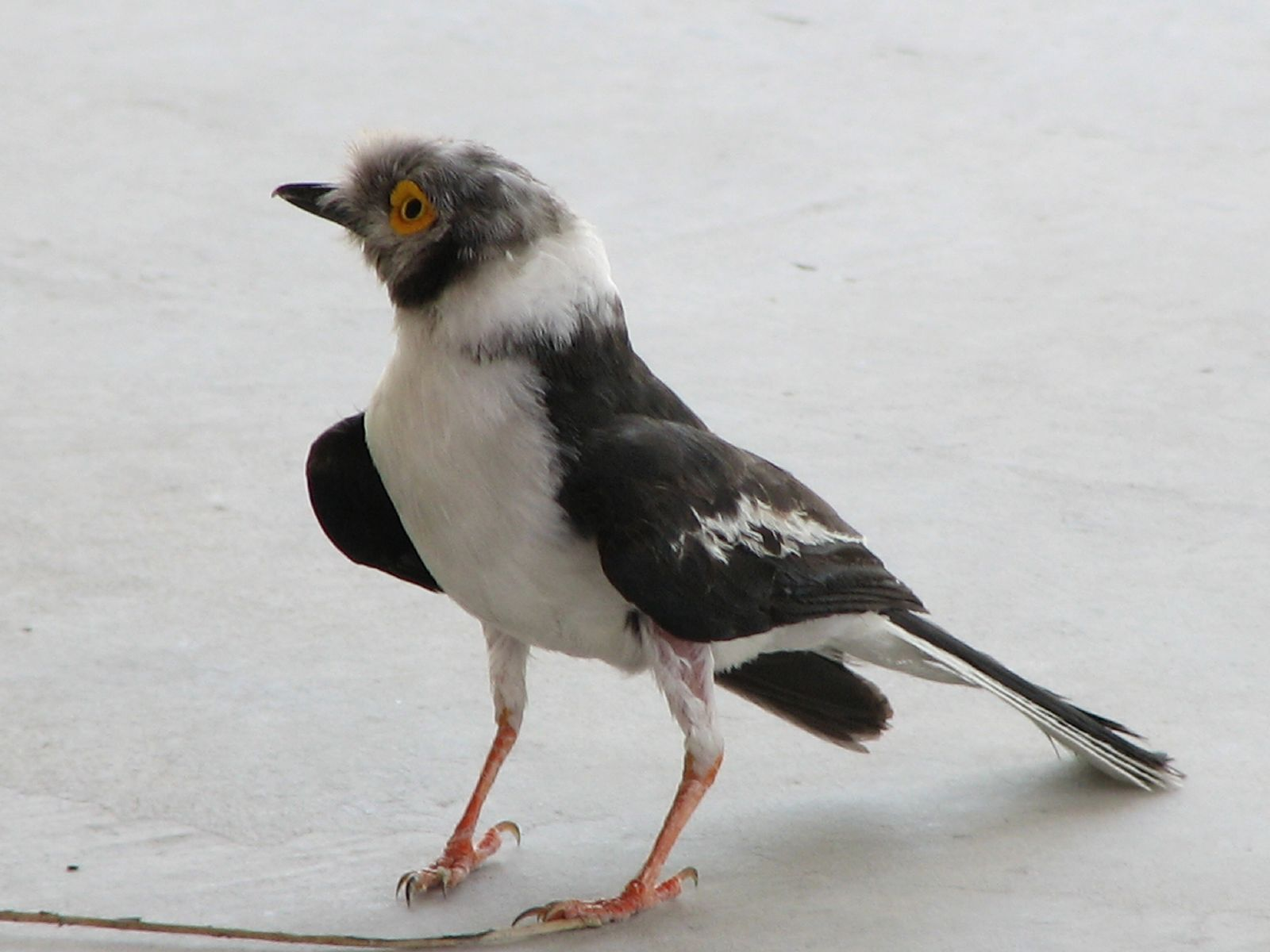
White helmetshrike

Order: Passeriformes Family: Vangidae

The helmetshrikes are similar in build to the shrikes, but tend to be colorful species with distinctive crests or other head ornaments, such as wattles, from which they get their name.

- White helmetshrike, Prionops plumatus (mlali ushungi-mweupe)
- Gray-crested helmetshrike, Prionops poliolophus (mlali ushungi-kijivu) (near-threatened)
- Retz's helmetshrike, Prionops retzii (mlali wa Retz)
- Chestnut-fronted helmetshrike, Prionops scopifrons (mlali paji-jekundu)
- African shrike-flycatcher, Megabyas flammulatus (cherimiyo-mbwigu)
- Black-and-white shrike-flycatcher, Bias musicus (cherimiyo rangi-mbili)

== Bushshrikes and allies ==
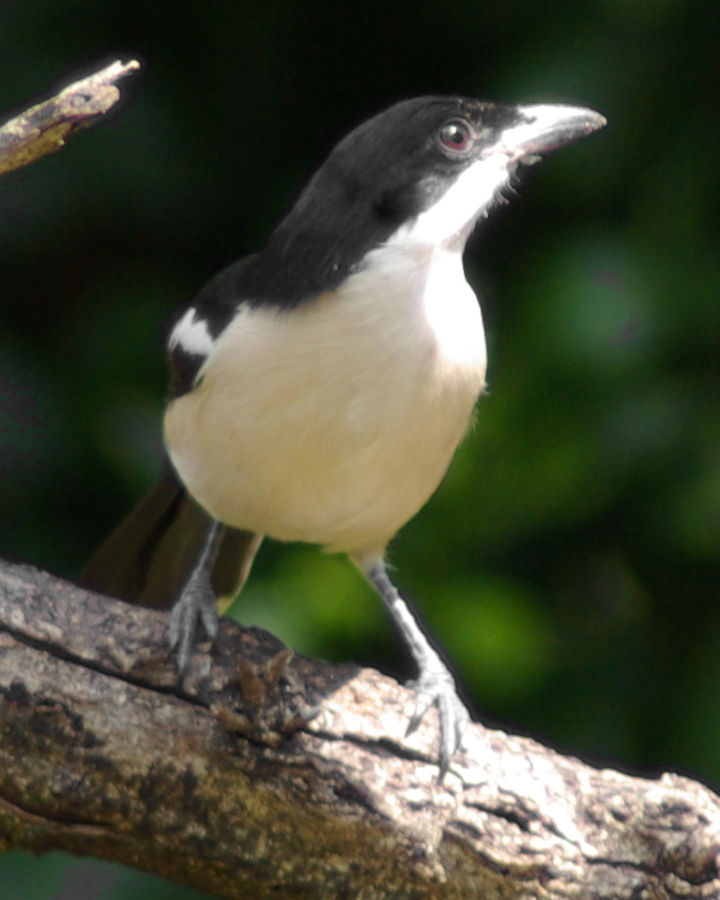
The tropical boubou is named for the call given in duet by a pair. This one is at the Masai Mara.

Order: Passeriformes Family: Malaconotidae

Bushshrikes are similar in habits to shrikes, hunting insects and other small prey from a perch on a bush. Although similar in build to the shrikes, these tend to be either colorful species or largely black; some species are quite secretive.

- Brubru, Nilaus afer
- Northern puffback, Dryoscopus gambensis (kipwe wa Gambia)
- Pringle's puffback, Dryoscopus pringlii (kipwe michirizi-myeupe)
- Black-backed puffback, Dryoscopus cubla (kipwe kiuno-cheupe)
- Pink-footed puffback, Dryoscopus angolensis (kipwe miguu-pinki)
- Marsh tchagra, Tchagra minuta (gongo la funo)
- Black-crowned tchagra, Tchagra senegala (kikuche utosi-mweusi)
- Brown-crowned tchagra, Tchagra australis (kikuche mwakijo)
- Three-streaked tchagra, Tchagra jamesi (kikuche michirizi-mitatu)
- Red-naped bushshrike, Laniarius ruficeps (tiva kisogo-chekundu)
- Coastal boubou, Laniarius nigerrimus (tiva Somali)
- Lühder's bushshrike, Laniarius luehderi (tiva wa Lühder)
- Ethiopian boubou, Laniarius aethiopicus (tiva Habeshi)
- Tropical boubou, Laniarius major (tiva magharibi)
- Zanzibar boubou, Laniarius sublacteus (tiva-pwani)
- Black-headed gonolek, Laniarius erythrogaster (tiva tumbo-jekundu)
- Papyrus gonolek, Laniarius mufumbiri (tiva-mafunjo) (near-threatened)
- Slate-colored boubou, Laniarius funebris (tiva kijivucheusi)
- Lowland sooty boubou, Laniarius leucorhynchus (tiva mweusi) (A)
- Rosy-patched bushshrike, Rhodophoneus cruentus (mbweta kidari-chekundu)
- Gray-green bushshrike, Chlorophoneus bocagei (mbweta kijanikijivu)
- Sulphur-breasted bushshrike, Chlorophoneus sulfureopectus (mbweta kidari-njano)
- Black-fronted bushshrike, Telophorus nigrifrons (mbweta paji-jeusi)
- Four-colored bushshrike, Telophorus viridis (mbweta mrembo)
- Doherty's bushshrike, Telophorus dohertyi (mbweta paji-jekundu)
- Gray-headed bushshrike, Malaconotus blanchoti (mbweta rangi-tatu)

== Drongos ==
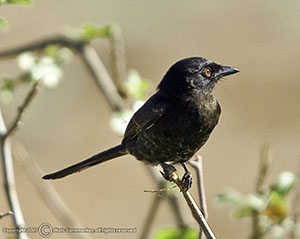
This fork-tailed drongo was photographed in Samburu National Reserve.

Order: Passeriformes Family: Dicruridae

The drongos are mostly black or dark gray in color, sometimes with metallic tints. They have long forked tails, and some Asian species have elaborate tail decorations. They have short legs and sit very upright when perched, like a shrike. They flycatch or take prey from the ground.

- Sharpe's drongo, Dicrurus sharpei (mramba wa Sharpe)
- Common square-tailed drongo, Dicrurus ludwigii (mramba mkia-mraba)
- Fork-tailed drongo, Dicrurus adsimilis (mramba mkia-panda)
- Velvet-mantled drongo, Dicrurus modestus (mramba mahameli)

== Monarch flycatchers ==
Order: Passeriformes Family: Monarchidae

The monarch flycatchers are small to medium-sized insectivorous passerines which hunt by flycatching.

- African crested-flycatcher, Trochocercus cyanomelas (chechele-kishungi buluu)
- Black-headed paradise-flycatcher, Terpsiphone rufiventer (chechele tumbo-jekundu)
- African paradise-flycatcher, Terpsiphone viridis (chechele tumbo-kijivu)

== Shrikes ==
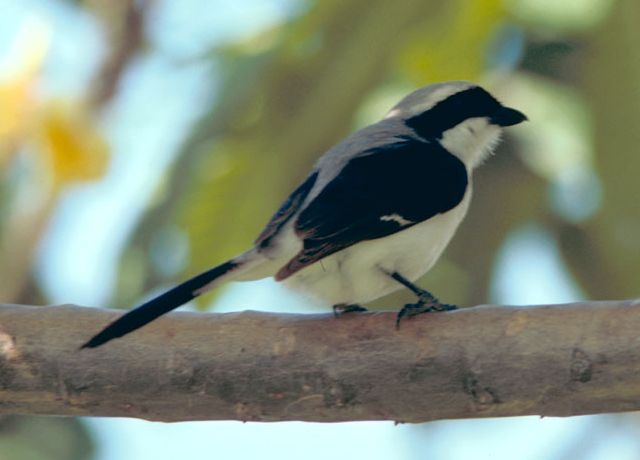
The gray-backed fiscal is found in relatively moist regions of southwestern Kenya.

Order: Passeriformes Family: Laniidae

Shrikes are passerine birds known for their habit of catching other birds and small animals and impaling the uneaten portions of their bodies on thorns. A shrike's beak is hooked, like that of a typical bird of prey.

- Red-backed shrike, Lanius collurio (mbwigu mgongo-mwekundu)
- Red-tailed shrike, Lanius phoenicuroides (mbwigu mkia-mwekundu)
- Isabelline shrike, Lanius isabellinus (mbwigu hudhurungi) (A)
- Great gray shrike, Lanius excubitor (mbwigu mkubwa) (A)
- Lesser gray shrike, Lanius minor (mbwigu mdogo)
- Gray-backed fiscal, Lanius excubitoroides (mbwigu mgongo-kijivu)
- Long-tailed fiscal, Lanius cabanisi (mbwigu kubo)
- Yellow-billed shrike, Lanius corvinus (mbwigu domo-njano)
- Magpie shrike, Lanius melanoleucus (mbwigu mkia-mrefu)
- Taita fiscal, Lanius dorsalis (mbwigu wa Taita)
- Somali fiscal, Lanius somalicus (mbwigu Somali)
- Mackinnon's shrike, Lanius mackinnoni (mbwigu mbavu-nyekundu)
- Northern fiscal, Lanius humeralis (mbwigu kaskazi)
- Masked shrike, Lanius nubicus (mbwigu Nubi) (A)
- Woodchat shrike, Lanius senator (mbwigu utosi-mwekundu)
- White-rumped shrike, Eurocephalus ruppelli (mbwigu utosi-mweupe kaskazi)

== Crows, jays, and ravens ==
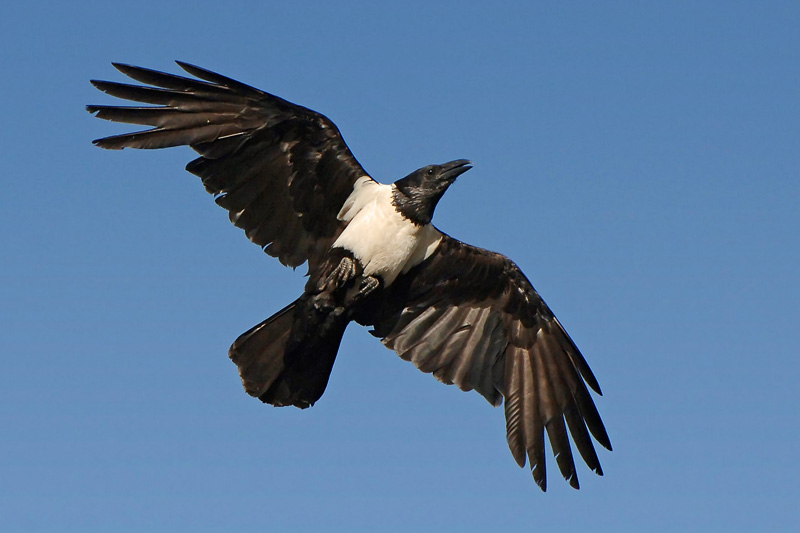
The pied crow is widespread, especially in cities and towns.

Order: Passeriformes Family: Corvidae

The family Corvidae includes crows, ravens, jays, choughs, magpies, treepies, nutcrackers, and ground jays. Corvids are above average in size among the Passeriformes, and some of the larger species show high levels of intelligence.

- Piapiac, Ptilostomus afer (kinubi)
- House crow, Corvus splendens (kunguru Bara-Hindi) (I)
- Cape crow, Corvus capensis (kunguru mwangapwani)
- Pied crow, Corvus albus (kunguru rangi-mbili)
- Somali crow, Corvus edithae (kunguru Somali)
- Fan-tailed raven, Corvus rhipidurus (kunguru mkia-mpana)
- White-necked raven, Corvus albicollis (kunguru kisogo-cheupe)

== Hyliotas ==
Order: Passeriformes Family: Hyliotidae

The members of this small family, all of genus Hyliota, are birds of the forest canopy. They tend to feed in mixed-species flocks.

- Yellow-bellied hyliota, Hyliota flavigaster (kucha tumbo-njano)
- Southern hyliota, Hyliota australis (kucha wa Mashona)

== Fairy flycatchers ==
Order: Passeriformes Family: Stenostiridae

Most of the species of this small family are found in Africa, though a few inhabit tropical Asia. They are not closely related to other birds called "flycatchers".

- African blue flycatcher, Elminia longicauda (chehele buluu)
- Dusky crested-flycatcher, Elminia nigromitrata (chechele-kishungi mweusi)
- White-tailed crested-flycatcher, Elminia albonotata (chechele-kishungi mkia-mweupe)

== Tits, chickadees, and titmice ==
Order: Passeriformes Family: Paridae

The Paridae are mainly small stocky woodland species with short stout bills. Some have crests. They are adaptable birds, with a mixed diet including seeds and insects.

- White-shouldered black-tit, Melaniparus guineensis (domofupi mabega-meupe)
- White-bellied tit, Melaniparus albiventris (domofupi tumbo-jeupe)
- Dusky tit, Melaniparus funereus (domofupi macho-mekundu)
- Somali tit, Melaniparus thruppi (domofupi Somali)
- Red-throated tit, Melaniparus fringillinus (domofupi koo-jekundu)

== Penduline-tits ==
Order: Passeriformes Family: Remizidae

The penduline tits are a group of small passerine birds related to the true tits. They are insectivores.

- Mouse-colored penduline-tit, Anthoscopus musculus (kabumbu kijivu)
- African penduline-tit, Anthoscopus caroli (kabumbu uso-njano)

== Larks ==
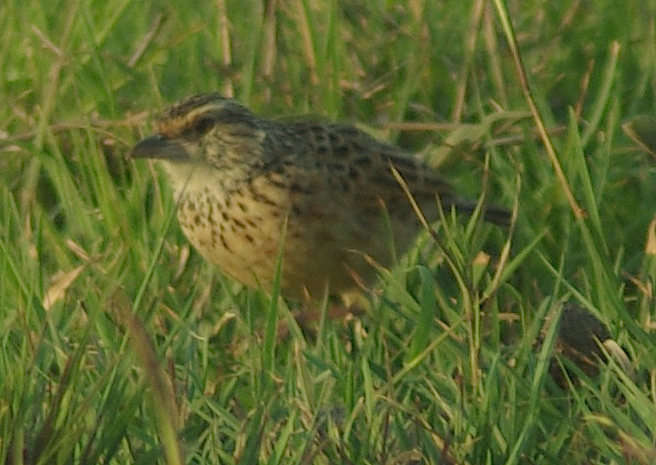
The rufous-naped lark is one of several similar-looking birds of the genus Mirafra that are found in Kenya. This one is at Sweetwaters Game Reserve.

Order: Passeriformes Family: Alaudidae

Larks are small terrestrial birds with often extravagant songs and display flights. Most larks are fairly dull in appearance. Their food is insects and seeds.

- Chestnut-backed sparrow-lark, Eremopterix leucotis (kindoro masikio-meupe)
- Chestnut-headed sparrow-lark, Eremopterix signata (kindoro kichwa-chekundu)
- Fischer's sparrow-lark, Eremopterix leucopareia (kindoro mashavu-meupe)
- Pink-breasted lark, Calendulauda poecilosterna (kipozamataza kidari-rangipinki)
- Fawn-colored lark, Calendulauda africanoides (kipozamataza hudhurungi)
- Collared lark, Mirafra collaris (kipozamataza mkufu)
- Red-winged lark, Mirafra hypermetra (kipozamataza mabawa-mekundu)
- Rufous-naped lark, Mirafra africana (kipozamataza kisogo-chekundu)
- Flappet lark, Mirafra rufocinnamomea (kipozamataza torotoro)
- Williams's lark, Mirafra williamsi (kipozamataza wa Williams) (E)
- Friedmann's lark, Mirafra pulpa (kipozamataza wa Friedman) (population data deficient)
- White-tailed lark, Mirafra albicauda (kipozamataza mkia-mweupe)
- Latakoo lark, Mirafra cheniana (kipozamataza wa Latakoo)
- Gillett's lark, Mirafra gilletti (kipozamataza wa Gillett)
- Red-capped lark, Calandrella cinerea (tuju utosi-mwekundu)
- Greater short-toed lark, Alaudala brachydactyla (tuju mkubwa) (A)
- Somali short-toed lark, Alaudala somalica (tuju Somali)
- Short-tailed lark, Spizocorys fremantlii (kipozamataza mkia-mfupi)
- Masked lark, Spizocorys personata (kipozamataza masharubu)
- Thekla's lark, Galerida theklae (kipozamataza wa Thekla)
- Crested lark, Galerida cristata (kipozamataza kishungi)

== Nicators ==
Order: Passeriformes Family: Nicatoridae

The nicators are shrike-like, with hooked bills. They are endemic to sub-Saharan Africa.

- Western nicator, Nicator chloris (kuwekuwe kijani) (A)
- Eastern nicator, Nicator gularis (kuwekuwe koo-jeupe)

== African warblers ==
Order: Passeriformes Family: Macrosphenidae

African warblers are small to medium-sized insectivores which are found in a wide variety of habitats south of the Sahara.

- Green crombec, Sylvietta virens (kikucha kijani)
- White-browed crombec, Sylvietta leucophrys (kikucha nyushi-nyeupe)
- Northern crombec, Sylvietta brachyura (kikucha kaskazi)
- Red-faced crombec, Sylvietta whytii (kikucha uso-mwekundu)
- Somali crombec, Sylvietta isabellina (kikucha Somali)
- Moustached grass-warbler, Melocichla mentalis (kuchakulu)
- Kretschmer's longbill, Macrosphenus kretschmeri (kolojojo wa Kretschmer)
- Green hylia, Hylia prasina (shoro kijani)

== Cisticolas and allies ==
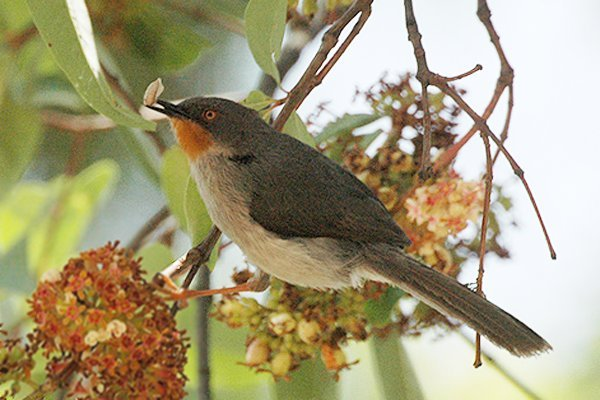
Chestnut-throated apalis

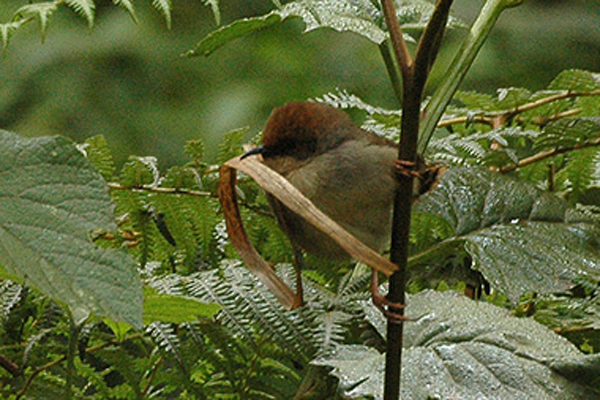
Chubb's cisticola

Order: Passeriformes Family: Cisticolidae

The Cisticolidae are warblers found mainly in warmer southern regions of the Old World. They are generally very small birds of drab brown or gray appearance found in open country such as grassland or scrub.

- Yellow-vented eremomela, Eremomela flavicrissalis (kuchanyika tako-njano)
- Yellow-bellied eremomela, Eremomela icteropygialis (kuchanyika tumbo-njano)
- Green-backed eremomela, Eremomela canescens (kuchanyika mgongo-kijani)
- Greencap eremomela, Eremomela scotops (kuchanyika utosi-kijani)
- Turner's eremomela, Eremomela turneri (kuchanyika paji-jekundu) (near-threatened)
- White-chinned prinia, Schistolais leucopogon (kolokolo kidevu-cheupe)
- Black-collared apalis, Oreolais pulcher (kolokolo mkufu-mweusi)
- Miombo wren-warbler, Calamonastes undosus (mshonaji-miyombo)
- Gray wren-warbler, Calamonastes simplex (mshonaji kijivu)
- Green-backed camaroptera, Camaroptera brachyura (mshonaji mgongo-kijani)
- Olive-green camaroptera, Camaroptera chloronota (mshonaji kijanikijivu)
- Cricket longtail, Spiloptila clamans (kolokolo paji-michirizi)
- Buff-bellied warbler, Phyllolais pulchella (kolokolo tumbo-marungi)
- Bar-throated apalis, Apalis thoracica (kolokolo mkufu)
- Taita apalis, Apalis fuscigularis (kolokolo wa Taita) (E) (critically endangered)
- Black-throated apalis, Apalis jacksoni (kolokolo koo-jeusi)
- White-winged apalis, Apalis chariessa (kolokolo mabawa-meupe) (near-threatened)
- Yellow-breasted apalis, Apalis flavida (kolokolo kidari-njano)
- Buff-throated apalis, Apalis rufogularis (kolokolo koo-marungi)
- Chestnut-throated apalis, Apalis porphyrolaema (kolokolo koo-jekundu)
- Black-headed apalis, Apalis melanocephala (kolokolo kichwa-cheusi)
- Gray apalis, Apalis cinerea (kolokolo kijivu)
- Brown-headed apalis, Apalis alticola (kolokolo kichwa-kahawia)
- Karamoja apalis, Apalis karamojae (kolokolo Karamoja) (A) (vulnerable)
- Tawny-flanked prinia, Prinia subflava (magamaga mbavu-kahawia)
- Pale prinia, Prinia somalica (magamaga Somali)
- River prinia, Prinia fluviatilis (magamaga-maji) (A)
- Banded prinia, Prinia bairdii (magamaga milia)
- Red-winged prinia, Prinia erythroptera (magamaga mabawa-mekundu)
- Red-fronted prinia, Prinia rufifrons (magamaga paji-jekundu)
- Black-faced rufous-warbler, Bathmocercus rufus (kibwirosagi uso-mweusi)
- Gray-capped warbler, Eminia lepida (kibwirosagi utosi-kijivu)
- Red-faced cisticola, Cisticola erythrops (kidenenda uso-mwekundu)
- Singing cisticola, Cisticola cantans (kidenenda mwimbaji)
- Whistling cisticola, Cisticola lateralis (kidenenda mpigambinja)
- Trilling cisticola, Cisticola woosnami (kidenenda sauti-madende)
- Chubb's cisticola, Cisticola chubbi (kidenenda tumbo-jeupe)
- Hunter's cisticola, Cisticola hunteri (kidenenda wa Hunter)
- Rock-loving cisticola, Cisticola aberrans (kidenenda mvivu)
- Boran cisticola, Cisticola bodessa (kidenenda Borana)
- Rattling cisticola, Cisticola chiniana (kidenenda taratara)
- Ashy cisticola, Cisticola cinereolus (kidenenda kijivu)
- Red-pate cisticola, Cisticola ruficeps (kidenenda kichwa-chekundu)
- Wailing cisticola, Cisticola lais (kidenenda mwombolezaji)
- Tana River cisticola, Cisticola restrictus (kidenenda wa Tana) (E) (population data deficient)
- Coastal cisticola, Cisticola haematocephalus (kidenenda pwani)
- Winding cisticola, Cisticola marginatus (kidenenda mkuu)
- Rufous-winged cisticola, Cisticola galactotes (kidenenda mabawa-mekundu)
- Carruthers's cisticola, Cisticola carruthersi (kidenenda wa Carruthers)
- Levaillant's cisticola, Cisticola tinniens (kidenenda wa Levaillant)
- Stout cisticola, Cisticola robustus (kidenenda mnene)
- Croaking cisticola, Cisticola natalensis (kidenenda kusi)
- Aberdare cisticola, Cisticola aberdare (kidenenda wa Aberdare) (E) (vulnerable)
- Tabora cisticola, Cisticola angusticaudus (kidenenda mkia-mrefu)
- Siffling cisticola, Cisticola brachypterus (kidenenda mpigamluzi)
- Foxy cisticola, Cisticola troglodytes (kidenenda kahawianyekundu)
- Tiny cisticola, Cisticola nana (kidenenda mdogo)
- Zitting cisticola, Cisticola juncidis (kidenenda zezete)
- Desert cisticola, Cisticola aridulus (kidenenda-jangwa)
- Black-backed cisticola, Cisticola eximius (kidenenda mgongo-mweusi)
- Pectoral-patch cisticola, Cisticola brunnescens (kidenenda baka)
- Wing-snapping cisticola, Cisticola ayresii (kidenenda mpigamabawa)

== Reed warblers and allies ==
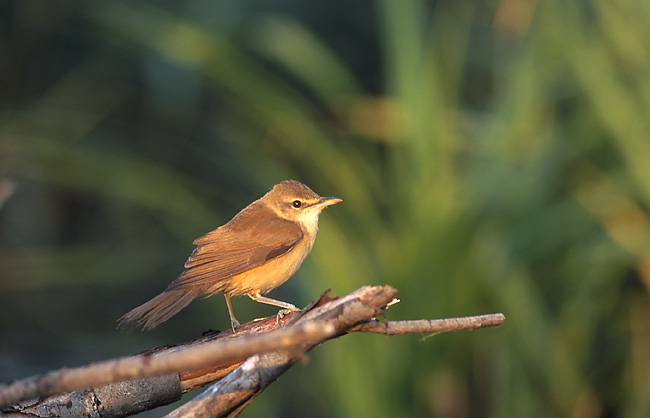
The great reed-warbler is a regular winter visitor to Kenya.

Order: Passeriformes Family: Acrocephalidae

The members of this family are usually rather large for "warblers". Most are rather plain olivaceous brown above with much yellow to beige below. They are usually found in open woodland, reedbeds, or tall grass. The family occurs mostly in southern to western Eurasia and surroundings, but it also ranges far into the Pacific, with some species in Africa.

- Papyrus yellow-warbler, Calamonastides gracilirostris (shoronjano domo-jembamba) (vulnerable)
- Eastern olivaceous warbler, Iduna pallida (shoronjano zeituni mashariki)
- African yellow-warbler, Iduna natalensis (shoronjano utosi-mweusi)
- Mountain yellow-warbler, Iduna similis (shoronjano-milima)
- Upcher's warbler, Hippolais languida (shoro mgongo-kijivu)
- Olive-tree warbler, Hippolais olivetorum (shoro-mizeituni)
- Melodious warbler, Hippolais polyglotta (shoro sauti-nzuri) (A)
- Icterine warbler, Hippolais icterina (shoro manjano)
- Sedge warbler, Acrocephalus schoenobaenus (shoro nyusi-nyeupe)
- Marsh warbler, Acrocephalus palustris (shoro-mabwawa)
- Common reed warbler, Acrocephalus scirpaceus (shoro-matet)
- Basra reed warbler, Acrocephalus griseldis (shoro wa Basra) (endangered)
- Lesser swamp warbler, Acrocephalus gracilirostris (shoro domo-jembamba)
- Greater swamp warbler, Acrocephalus rufescens (shoro-lambo)
- Great reed warbler, Acrocephalus arundinaceus (shoro mkuu)

== Grassbirds and allies ==
Order: Passeriformes Family: Locustellidae

Locustellidae are a family of small insectivorous songbirds found mainly in Eurasia, Africa, and the Australian region. They are smallish birds with tails that are usually long and pointed, and tend to be drab brownish or buffy all over.

- River warbler, Locustella fluviatilis (shoro-mito)
- Savi's warbler, Locustella luscinioides (shoro wa Savi) (A)
- Common grasshopper-warbler, Locustella naevia (shoro sauti-panzi) (A)
- Fan-tailed grassbird, Catriscus brevirostris (shoro mkia-mpana)
- Evergreen-forest warbler, Bradypterus lopezi (shoro-milima)
- Cinnamon bracken-warbler, Bradypterus cinnamomeus (shoro kidari-chekundu)
- Little rush warbler, Bradypterus baboecala (shoro mgongo-kahawia)
- White-winged swamp warbler, Bradypterus carpalis (shoro mabawa-meupe)
- Highland rush warbler, Bradypterus centralis (shoro mashariki)

== Swallows ==
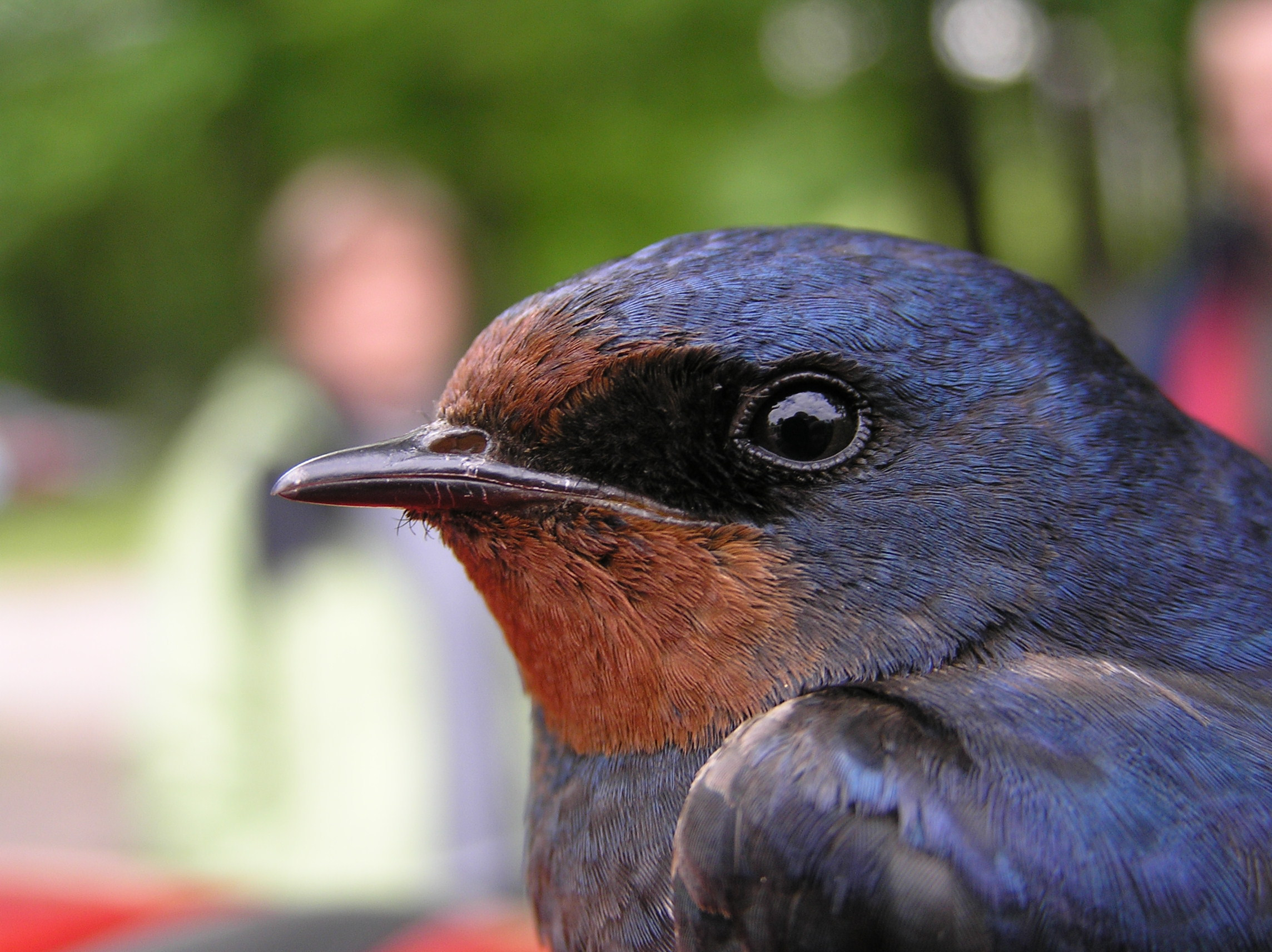
Wintering barn swallows from Europe and Asia are widespread in Kenya.

Order: Passeriformes Family: Hirundinidae

The family Hirundinidae is adapted to aerial feeding. They have a slender streamlined body, long pointed wings, and a short bill with a wide gape. The feet are adapted to perching rather than walking, and the front toes are partially joined at the base.

- Plain martin, Riparia paludicola (kinega koo-kahawia)
- Bank swallow, Riparia riparia (kinega-mchanga)
- Banded martin, Neophedina cincta (kinega miraba)
- Mascarene martin, Phedina borbonica (kinega-visiwa) (A)
- Rock martin, Ptyonoprogne fuligula (kinega-mawe)
- Barn swallow, Hirundo rustica (mbayuwayu wa Ulaya)
- Ethiopian swallow, Hirundo aethiopica (mbayuwayu Habeshi)
- Angola swallow, Hirundo angolensis (mbayuwayu wa Angola)
- Wire-tailed swallow, Hirundo smithii (mbayuwayu mkia-sindano)
- Montane blue swallow, Hirundo atrocaerulea (kizelele-milima) (vulnerable)
- Red-rumped swallow, Cecropis daurica (mbayuwayu kiuno-chekundu)
- Lesser striped swallow, Cecropis abyssinica (mbayuwayu michirizi mdogo)
- Rufous-chested swallow, Cecropis semirufa (mbayuwayu tumbo-jekundu)
- Mosque swallow, Cecropis senegalensis (mbayuwayu mkubwa)
- South African swallow, Petrochelidon spilodera (mbayuwayu kusi) (A)
- Common house-martin, Delichon urbicum (mbayuwayu-kaya)
- White-headed sawwing, Psalidoprocne albiceps (mbayuwayu kichwa-cheupe)
- Black sawwing, Psalidoprocne pristoptera (mbayuwayu mweusi)
- Gray-rumped swallow, Pseudhirundo griseopyga (mbayuwayu kiuno-kijivu)

== Bulbuls ==
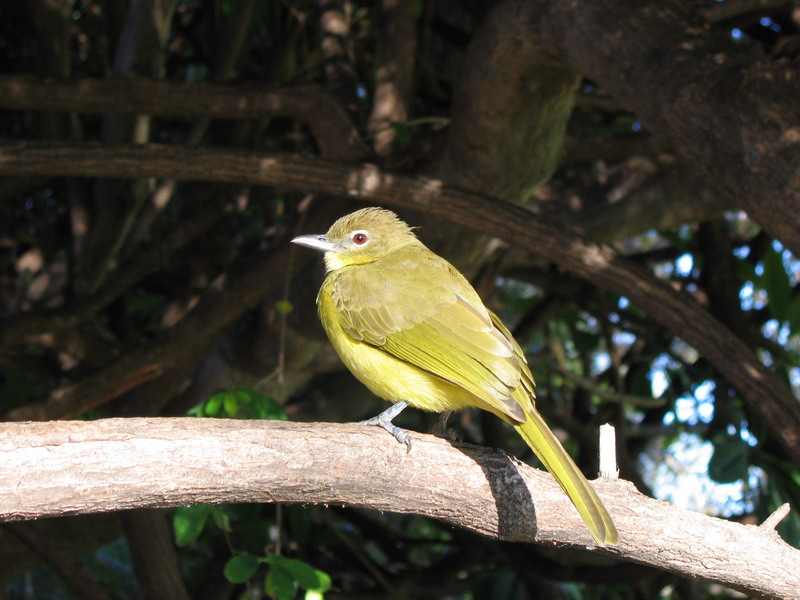
Yellow-bellied greenbul

Order: Passeriformes Family: Pycnonotidae

Bulbuls are medium-sized songbirds. Some are colorful with yellow, red, or orange vents, cheeks, throats, or supercilia, but most are drab, with uniform olive-brown to black plumage. Some species have distinct crests.

- Sombre greenbul, Andropadus importunus (kuruwiji)
- Slender-billed greenbul, Stelgidillas gracilirostris (nyembelele domo-jembamba)
- Red-tailed bristlebill, Bleda syndactylus (domosharubu mkia-mwekundu)
- Lesser bristlebill, Bleda notatus (domosharubu mdogo) (A)
- Shelley's greenbul, Arizelocichla masukuensis (nyembelele wa Shelley)
- Eastern mountain greenbul, Arizelocichla nigriceps (nyembelele-milima)
- Stripe-cheeked greenbul, Arizelocichla milanjensis (nyembelele mashavu-michirizi)
- Yellow-bellied greenbul, Chlorocichla flaviventris (nyembelele tumbo-njano)
- Joyful greenbul, Chlorocichla laetissima (nyembelele furaha)
- Honeyguide greenbul, Baeopogon indicator (nyembelele kiongozi)
- Yellow-throated greenbul, Atimastillas flavicollis (nyembelele koo-njano)
- Red-tailed greenbul, Criniger calurus (nyembelele korogoto mkia-mwekundu) (A)
- Gray greenbul, Eurillas gracilis (nyembelele kijivu)
- Ansorge's greenbul, Eurillas ansorgei (nyembelele wa Ansorge)
- Plain greenbul, Eurillas curvirostris (nyembelele domo-pindo)
- Yellow-whiskered bulbul, Eurillas latirostris (nyembelele masharubu-njano)
- Little greenbul, Eurillas virens (nyembelele mdogo)
- Terrestrial brownbul, Phyllastrephus terrestris (korogoto mkubwa)
- Northern brownbul, Phyllastrephus strepitans (korogoto mpayupayu)
- Gray-olive greenbul, Phyllastrephus cerviniventris (korogoto kijivu)
- Toro olive-greenbul, Phyllastrephus hypochloris (korogoto wa Toro)
- Fischer's greenbul, Phyllastrephus fischeri (korogoto wa Fischer)
- Cabanis's greenbul, Phyllastrephus cabanisi (korogoto wa Cabanis)
- Yellow-streaked bulbul, Phyllastrephus flavostriatus (korogoto michirizi-njano) (A)
- Tiny greenbul, Phyllastrephus debilis (korogoto mdogo)
- Common bulbul, Pycnonotus barbatus (shore tako-jeupe)

== Leaf warblers ==
Order: Passeriformes Family: Phylloscopidae

Leaf warblers are a family of small insectivorous birds found mostly in Eurasia and ranging into Wallacea and Africa. The species are of various sizes, often green-plumaged above and yellow below, or more subdued with grayish-green to grayish-brown colors.

- Wood warbler, Phylloscopus sibilatrix (kuchamsitu mpigamluzi)
- Willow warbler, Phylloscopus trochilus (kuchamsitu wa Ulaya)
- Common chiffchaff, Phylloscopus collybita (kuchamsitu sauti-mbili)
- Brown woodland-warbler, Phylloscopus umbrovirens (kuchamsitu kahawia)
- Yellow-throated woodland-warbler, Phylloscopus ruficapillus (kuchamsitu koo-njano)
- Uganda woodland-warbler, Phylloscopus budongoensis (kuchamsitu wa Uganda)

== Bush warblers and allies ==
Order: Passeriformes Family: Scotocercidae

The members of this family are found throughout Africa, Asia, and Polynesia. Their taxonomy is in flux, and some authorities place genus Erythrocerus in another family.

- Yellow flycatcher, Erythrocercus holochlorus (ndwindwi manjano)

== Sylviid warblers, parrotbills, and allies ==
Order: Passeriformes Family: Sylviidae

The family Sylviidae is a group of small insectivorous passerine birds. They mainly occur as breeding species, as the common name implies, in Europe, Asia, and, to a lesser extent, Africa. Most are of generally undistinguished appearance, but many have distinctive songs.

- Eurasian blackcap, Sylvia atricapilla (kucha utosi-mweusi)
- Garden warbler, Sylvia borin (kucha-bustani)
- African hill babbler, Sylvia abyssinica (kucha-vilima wa Afrika)
- Barred warbler, Curruca nisoria (kucha milia)
- Banded parisoma, Curruca boehmi (kucha koo-madoa)
- Lesser whitethroat, Curruca curruca (kucha koo-jeupe mdogo) (A)
- Brown parisoma, Curruca lugens (kucha kahawia)
- Greater whitethroat, Curruca communis (kucha koo-jeupe mkubwa)

== White-eyes, yuhinas, and allies ==
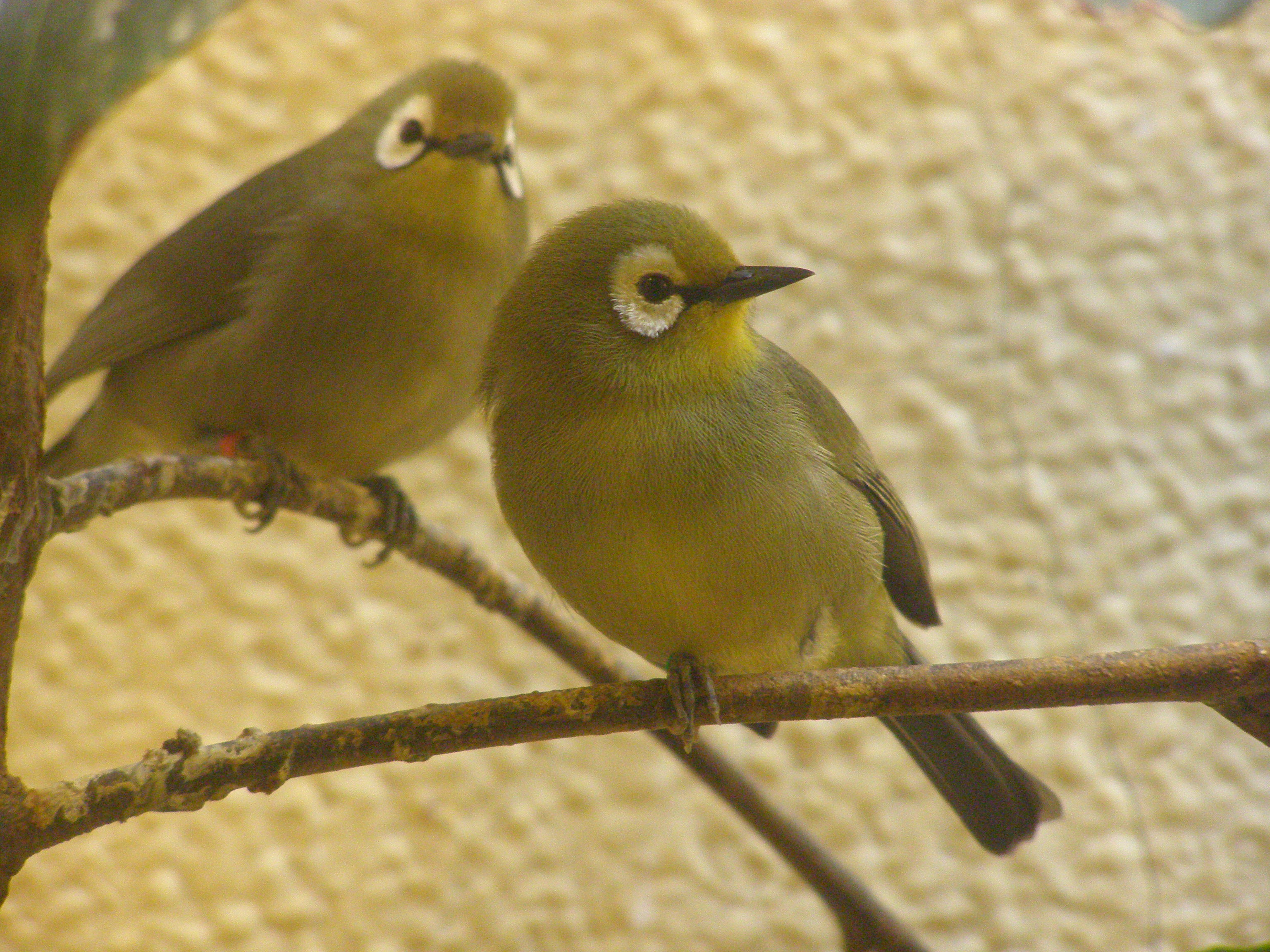
These Kikuyu white-eyes were formerly considered a subspecies of Heuglin's white-eye.

Order: Passeriformes Family: Zosteropidae

The white-eyes are small and mostly undistinguished, their plumage above being generally some dull color like greenish-olive, but some species have a white or bright yellow throat, breast, or lower parts, and several have buff flanks. As their name suggests, many species have a white ring around each eye.

- Pale white-eye, Zosterops flavilateralis (kinengenenge mbavu-njano)
- Mbulu white-eye, Zosterops mbuluensis (kinengenenge wa Mbulu)
- Green white-eye, Zosterops stuhlmanni (kinengenenge kijani)
- Kilimanjaro white-eye, Zosterops eurycricotus (kinengenenge mviringo-mpana) (A)
- Heuglin's white-eye, Zosterops poliogastrus (kinengenenge-milima)
- Kikuyu white-eye, Zosterops kikuyuensis (kinengenenge Kikuyu) (E)
- Taita white-eye, Zosterops silvanus (kinengenenge wa Taita) (E) (endangered)
- Northern yellow white-eye, Zosterops senegalensis (kinengenenge manjano kaskazi)

== Ground babblers and allies ==
Order: Passeriformes Family: Pellorneidae

These small to medium-sized songbirds have soft fluffy plumage but are otherwise rather diverse. Members of the genus Illadopsis are found in forests, but some other genera are birds of scrublands.

- Brown illadopsis, Illadopsis fulvescens
- Pale-breasted illadopsis, Illadopsis rufipennis
- Mountain illadopsis, Illadopsis pyrrhoptera
- Scaly-breasted illadopsis, Illadopsis albipectus

== Laughingthrushes and allies ==
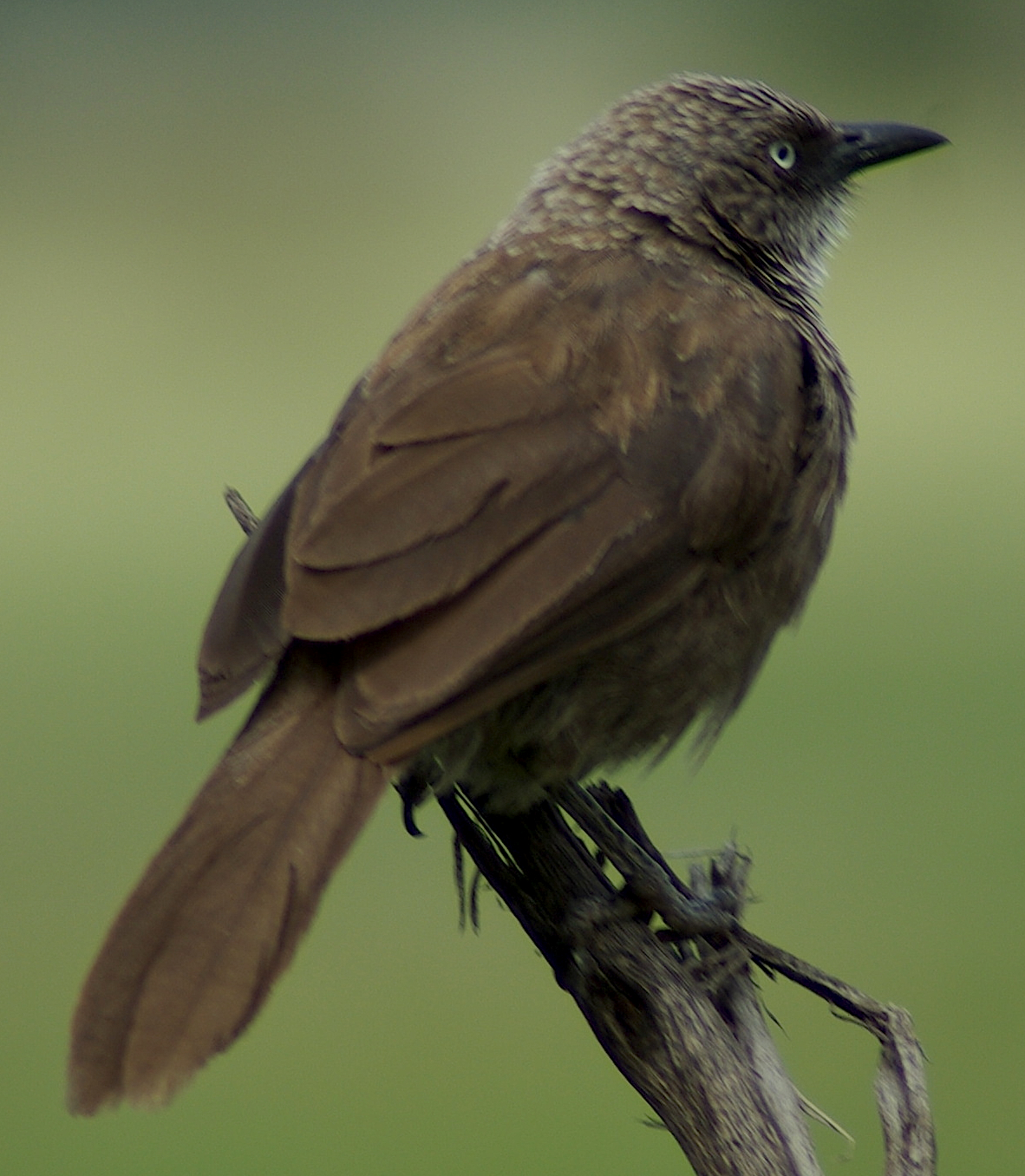
The black-lored babbler is a noisy and gregarious bird, like many other laughingthrushes in Kenya. This one is at Sweetwaters Tented Camp.

Order: Passeriformes Family: Leiothrichidae

The members of this family are diverse in size and coloration, though those of genus Turdoides tend to be brown or grayish. The family is found in Africa, India, and southeast Asia.

- Rufous chatterer, Argya rubiginosa (kanghagha tumbo-kahawianyekundu)
- Scaly chatterer, Argya aylmeri (kanghagha mabaka)
- Brown babbler, Turdoides plebejus (kanghagha kahawia)
- Hinde's pied-babbler, Turdoides hindei (zogoyogo wa Hinda) (E) (vulnerable)
- Scaly babbler, Turdoides squamulata (kanghagha madoadoa)
- Arrow-marked babbler, Turdoides jardineii (zogoyogo)
- Black-lored babbler, Turdoides sharpei (zogoyogo wa Sharpe)
- Northern pied-babbler, Turdoides hypoleuca (kanghagha tumbo-jeupe)

== Treecreepers ==
Order: Passeriformes Family: Certhiidae

Treecreepers are small woodland birds, brown above and white below. They have thin pointed down-curved bills which they use to extricate insects from bark. They have stiff tail feathers, like woodpeckers, which they use to support themselves on vertical trees.

- African spotted creeper, Salpornis salvadori (tambarazi madoadoa)

== Oxpeckers ==
Order: Passeriformes Family: Buphagidae

As both the English and scientific names of these birds imply, they feed on ectoparasites, primarily ticks, found on large mammals.

- Red-billed oxpecker, Buphagus erythrorynchus (shashi domo-jekundu)
- Yellow-billed oxpecker, Buphagus africanus (shashi domo-njano)

== Starlings ==
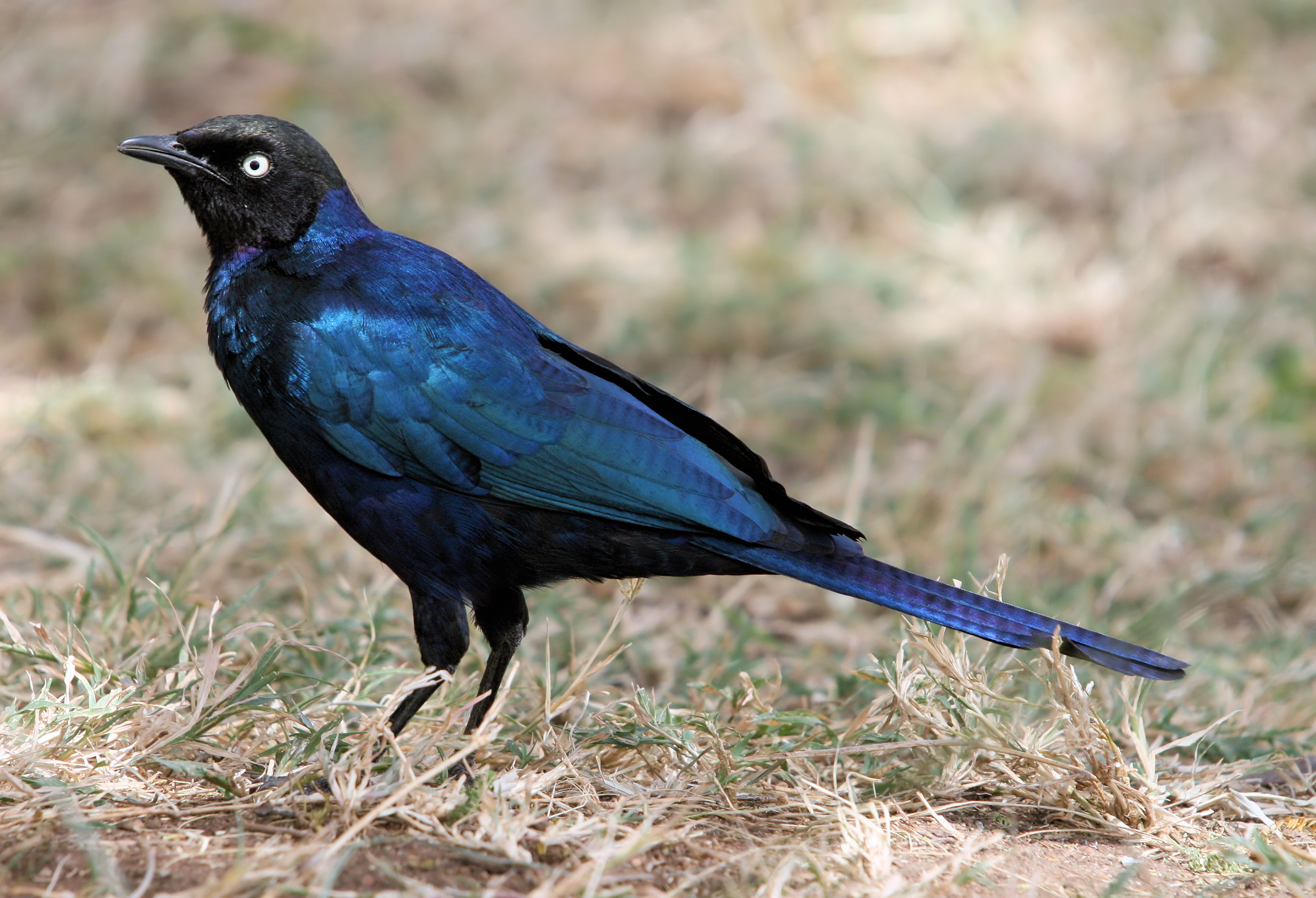
Rüppell's starling

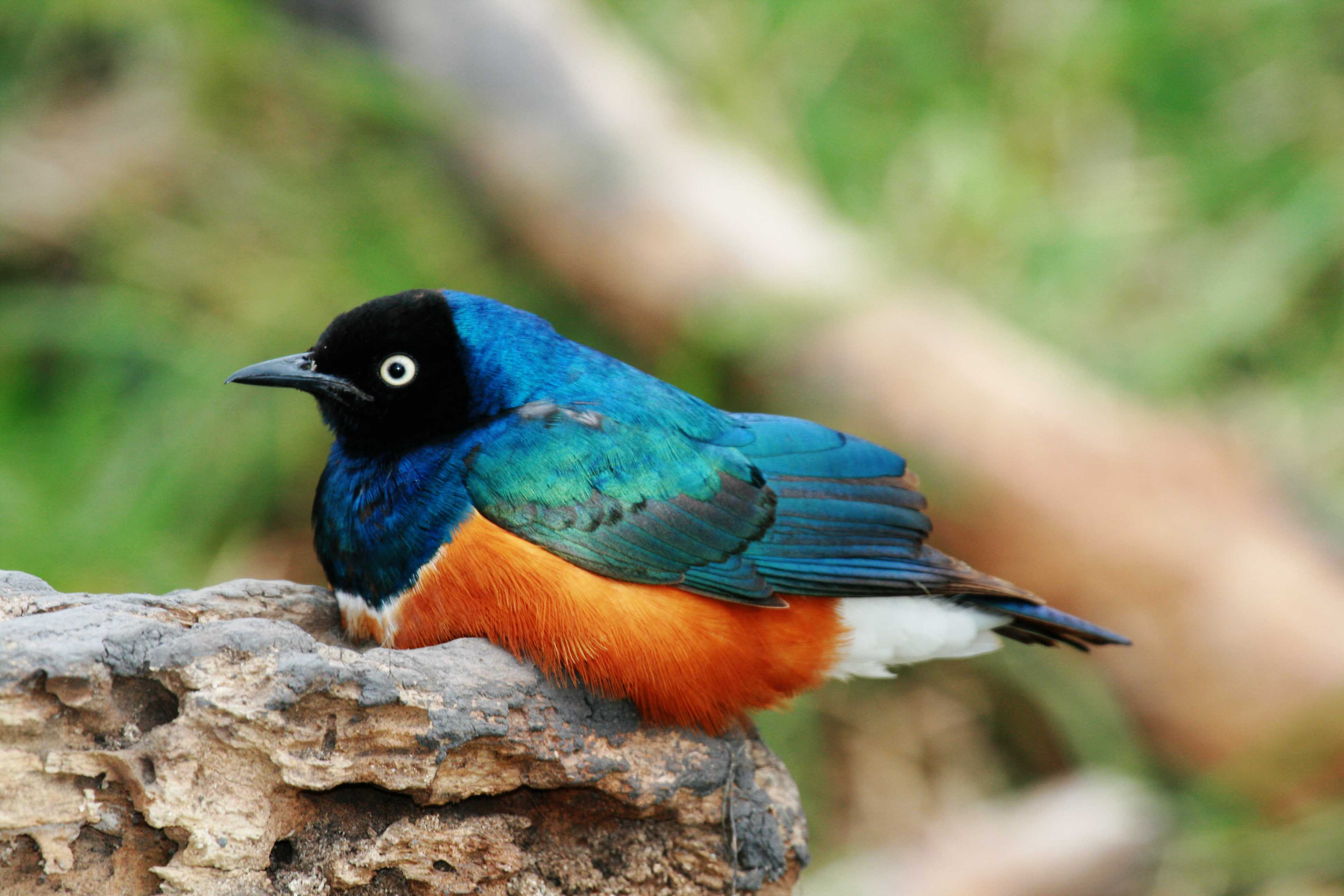
The superb starling is one of Kenya's most conspicuous birds.

Order: Passeriformes Family: Sturnidae

Starlings are small to medium-sized passerine birds. Their flight is strong and direct and they are very gregarious. Their preferred habitat is fairly open country. They eat insects and fruit. Plumage is typically dark with a metallic sheen.

- Wattled starling, Creatophora cinerea (kwenzi dehe)
- Rosy starling, Pastor roseus (kwenzi pinki) (A)
- Violet-backed starling, Cinnyricinclus leucogaster (kwenzi mgongo-zambarau)
- Slender-billed starling, Onychognathus tenuirostris (kizole domo-jembamba)
- Neumann's starling, Onychognathus neumanni (kizole wa Neumann)
- Red-winged starling, Onychognathus morio (kizole mabawa-mekundu)
- Waller's starling, Onychognathus walleri (kizole wa Waller)
- Bristle-crowned starling, Onychognathus salvadorii (kizole utosi-mahameli)
- Magpie starling, Speculipastor bicolor (kwenzi rangi-mbili)
- Sharpe's starling, Pholia sharpii (kwenzi koo-jeupe)
- Abbott's starling, Arizelopsar femoralis (kwenzi kichwa-cheupe) (vulnerable)
- Stuhlmann's starling, Poeoptera stuhlmanni (kwenzi kichwa-buluu)
- Kenrick's starling, Poeoptera kenricki (kwenzi wa Kenrick)
- Black-bellied starling, Notopholia corusca (nyangala)
- Hildebrandt's starling, Lamprotornis hildebrandti (kwenzi-jangwa)
- Shelley's starling, Lamprotornis shelleyi (kuzi macho-machungwa)
- Rüppell's starling, Lamprotornis purpuroptera (kuzi wa Rüppell)
- Splendid starling, Lamprotornis splendidus (kuzi mrembo)
- Golden-breasted starling, Lamprotornis regius (kuzi kidari-dhahabu)
- Superb starling, Lamprotornis superbus (kuzi maridadi)
- White-crowned starling, Lamprotornis albicapillus (kuzi utosi-mweupe)
- Fischer's starling, Lamprotornis fischeri (kuzi mweupe)
- Lesser blue-eared starling, Lamprotornis chloropterus (kuzi mabawa-kijani)
- Greater blue-eared starling, Lamprotornis chalybaeus (kuzi macho-njano)
- Purple starling, Lamprotornis purpureus (kuzi zambarau)
- Bronze-tailed starling, Lamprotornis chalcurus (kuzi mkia-bronzi)

== Thrushes and allies ==
Order: Passeriformes Family: Turdidae

The thrushes are a group of passerine birds that occur mainly in the Old World. They are plump, soft plumaged, small to medium-sized insectivores or sometimes omnivores, often feeding on the ground. Many have attractive songs.

- Red-tailed ant-thrush, Neocossyphus rufus (shesiafu mkia-mwekundu)
- White-tailed ant-thrush, Neocossyphus poensis (shesiafu mkia-mweupe)
- Spotted ground-thrush, Geokichla guttata (mkesha madoadoa) (endangered)
- Abyssinian ground-thrush, Geokichla piaggiae (mkesha Habeshi)
- Orange ground-thrush, Geokichla gurneyi (mkesha rangi-machungwa)
- Abyssinian thrush, Turdus abyssinicus (mkesha-milima)
- Taita thrush, Turdus helleri (mkesha wa Taita) (E) (critically endangered)
- African bare-eyed thrush, Turdus tephronotus (mkesha macho-wazi)
- African thrush, Turdus pelios (mkesha wa Afrika)

== Old World flycatchers ==
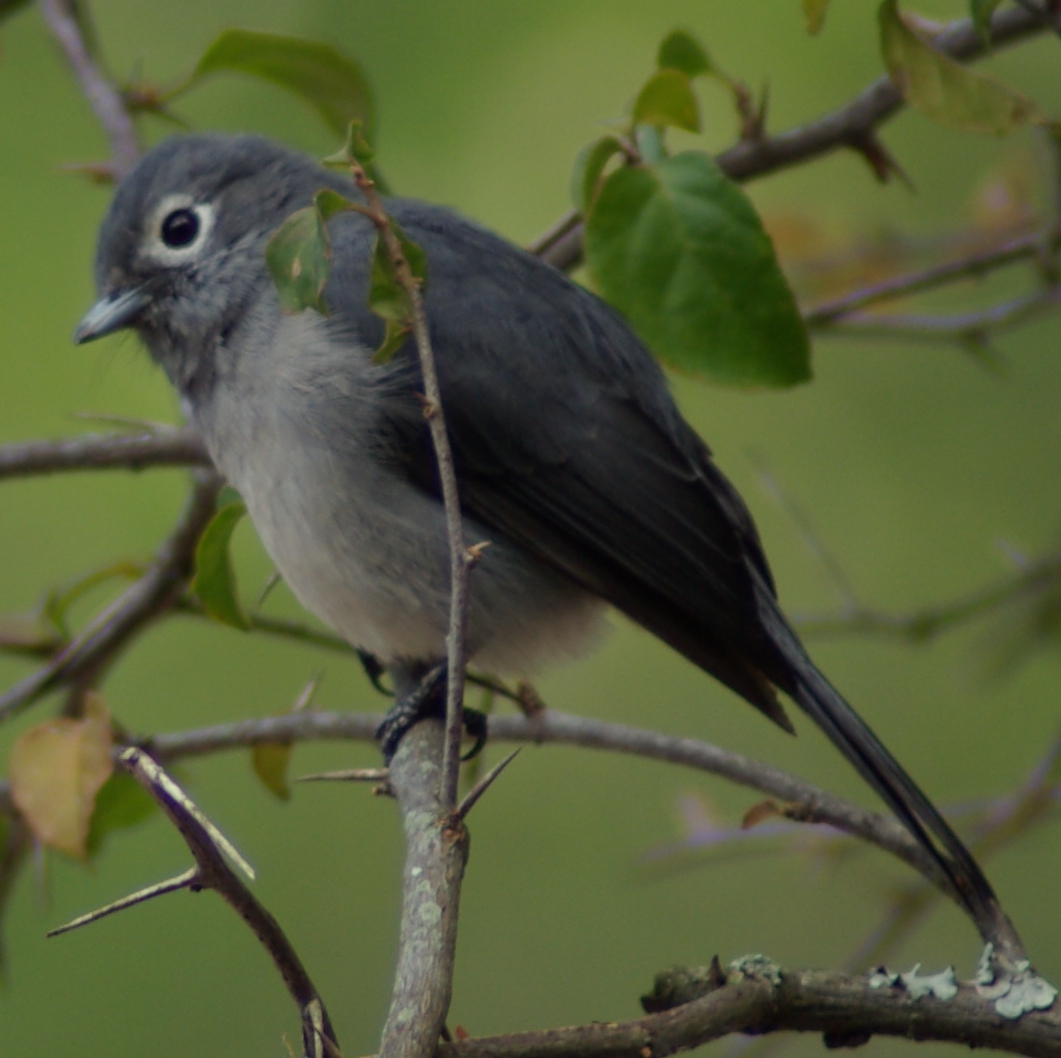
The white-eyed slaty-flycatcher is active at twilight and often allows a close approach, as this one at Thomson's Falls did.

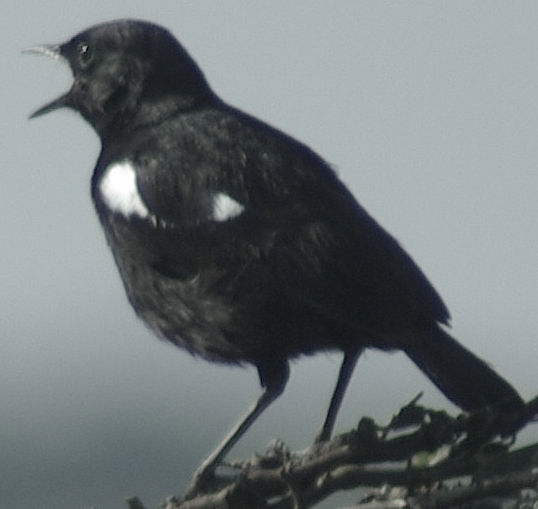
Adult male sooty chat at Masai Mara National Reserve

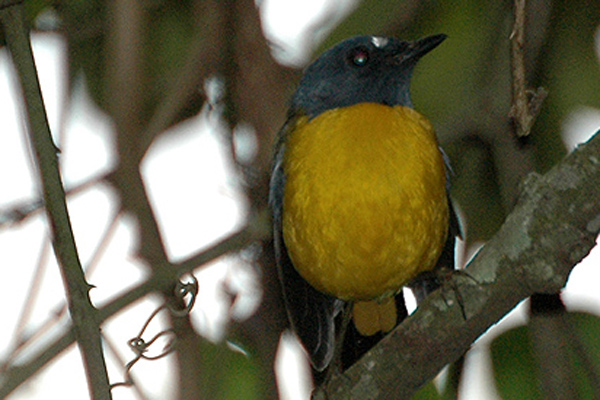
White-starred robin

Order: Passeriformes Family: Muscicapidae

Old World flycatchers are a large group of small passerine birds native to the Old World. They are mainly small arboreal insectivores. The appearance of these birds is highly varied, but they mostly have weak songs and harsh calls.

- African dusky flycatcher, Muscicapa adusta (shore kijivucheusi)
- Spotted flycatcher, Muscicapa striata (shore kidari-michirizi)
- Gambaga flycatcher, Muscicapa gambagae (shore wa Gambaga)
- Swamp flycatcher, Muscicapa aquatica (shore-mbuga)
- African gray flycatcher, Bradornis microrhynchus (kidaku kijivu)
- Pale flycatcher, Agricola pallidus (kidaku chuju)
- Gray tit-flycatcher, Fraseria plumbea (shore rangi-risasi)
- Chapin's flycatcher, Fraseria lendu (shore wa Chapin) (vulnerable)
- Ashy flycatcher, Fraseria caerulescens (shore kijivubuluu)
- Silverbird, Empidornis semipartitus (gongo shaba)
- Northern black-flycatcher, Melaenornis edolioides (kidaku kaskazi)
- Southern black-flycatcher, Melaenornis pammelaina (kidaku kusi)
- White-eyed slaty-flycatcher, Melaenornis fischeri (chekiro)
- Bearded scrub-robin, Tychaedon quadrivirgata (kurumbiza masharubu-meupe)
- Rufous-tailed scrub-robin, Cercotrichas galactotes (kurumbiza kahawiachekundu)
- Brown-backed scrub-robin, Cercotrichas hartlaubi (kurumbiza mgongo-kahawia)
- Red-backed scrub-robin, Cercotrichas leucophrys (kurumbiza mgongo-mwekundu)
- Cape robin-chat, Cossypha caffra (kurumbiza tumbo-kijivu)
- Blue-shouldered robin-chat, Cossypha cyanocampter (kurumbiza mabega-buluu)
- Gray-winged robin-chat, Sheppardia polioptera (kurumbiza mabawa-kijivu)
- Rüppell's robin-chat, Cossypha semirufa (kurumbiza wa Rüppell)
- White-browed robin-chat, Cossypha heuglini (kurumbiza wa Heuglin)
- Red-capped robin-chat, Cossypha natalensis (kurumbiza utosi-mwekundu)
- Snowy-crowned robin-chat, Cossypha niveicapilla (kurumbiza upara-mweupe)
- Collared palm-thrush, Cichladusa arquata (madende mkufu)
- Spotted morning-thrush, Cichladusa guttata (madende madoadoa)
- White-starred robin, Pogonocichla stellata (zuwanende kidari-njano)
- Brown-chested alethe, Chamaetylas poliocephala (mkeshamsitu kidari-kahawia)
- Yellow-breasted forest robin, Stiphrornis xanthothorax (zuwanende-misitu kidari-njano) (A)
- Equatorial akalat, Sheppardia aequatorialis (zuwanende mashavu-kijivu)
- East coast akalat, Sheppardia gunningi (zuwanende-pwani) (near-threatened)
- White-throated robin, Irania gutturalis (kurumbiza mwajemi)
- Thrush nightingale, Luscinia luscinia (kurumbiza tumbo-madoa)
- Common nightingale, Luscinia megarhynchos (kurumbiza wa Ulaya)
- Semicollared flycatcher, Ficedula semitorquata (shore mkufu)
- European pied flycatcher, Ficedula hypoleuca (shore wa Ulaya) (A)
- Collared flycatcher, Ficedula albicollis (shore shingo-nyeupe) (A)
- Common redstart, Phoenicurus phoenicurus (kurumbiza mkia-mwekundu)
- Little rock-thrush, Monticola rufocinereus (chatimwamba mdogo)
- Rufous-tailed rock-thrush, Monticola saxatilis (kurumbiza mkia-mwekundu)
- Whinchat, Saxicola rubetra (mhozo mchirizi-mweupe)
- Siberian stonechat, Saxicola maurus (mhozo wa Siberia) (A)
- African stonechat, Saxicola torquatus (mhozo kidari-chekundu)
- Moorland chat, Pinarochroa sordida (chati-milima)
- Mocking cliff-chat, Thamnolaea cinnamomeiventris (chati-chamawe)
- Sooty chat, Myrmecocichla nigra (chati mabega-meupe)
- Northern anteater-chat, Myrmecocichla aethiops (chati makwapa-meupe)
- Arnot's chat, Myrmecocichla arnotti (chati wa Arnott) (A)
- Northern wheatear, Oenanthe oenanthe (mhozo kaskazi)
- Capped wheatear, Oenanthe pileata (mhozo utosi-mweusi)
- Isabelline wheatear, Oenanthe isabellina (mhozo kidari-pinki)
- Heuglin's wheatear, Oenanthe heuglini (mhozo wa Heuglin)
- Desert wheatear, Oenanthe deserti (mhozo-jangwa) (A)
- Cyprus wheatear, Oenanthe cypriaca (mhozo wa Kupro)
- Eastern black-eared wheatear, Oenanthe melanoleuca (mhozo masikio-meusi mashariki) (A)
- Pied wheatear, Oenanthe pleschanka (mhozo mgongo-kijivu)
- Familiar chat, Oenanthe familiaris (mhozo mkia-mwekundu)
- Brown-tailed chat, Oenanthe scotocerca (mhozo mkia-kahawia)
- Abyssinian wheatear, Oenanthe lugubris (mhozo Habeshi)
- Mourning wheatear, Oenanthe lugens (mhozo-msiba)

== Dapple-throat and allies ==
Order: Passeriformes Family: Modulatricidae

This species and two others, all of different genera, were formerly placed in family Promeropidae, the sugarbirds, but were accorded their own family in 2017.

- Gray-chested babbler, Kakamega poliothorax (mkesha kidari-kijivu)

== Sunbirds and spiderhunters ==
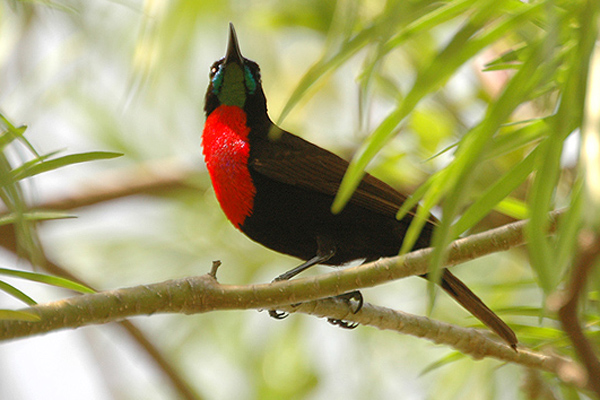
Scarlet-chested sunbird

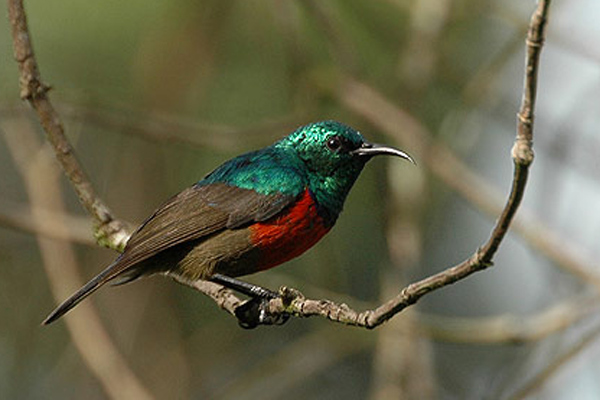
Northern double-collared sunbird

Order: Passeriformes Family: Nectariniidae

The sunbirds and spiderhunters are very small passerine birds which feed largely on nectar, although they will also take insects, especially when feeding young. Flight is fast and direct on their short wings. Most species can take nectar by hovering like a hummingbird, but usually perch to feed.

- Plain-backed sunbird, Anthreptes reichenowi (chozi koo-buluu) (near-threatened)
- Western violet-backed sunbird, Anthreptes longuemarei (chozi mgongo-zambarau)
- Eastern violet-backed sunbird, Anthreptes orientalis (chozi kiuno-buluu)
- Uluguru violet-backed sunbird, Anthreptes neglectus (chozi wa Uluguru)
- Green sunbird, Anthreptes rectirostris (chozi kijani)
- Collared sunbird, Hedydipna collaris (chozi mkufu)
- Pygmy sunbird, Hedydipna platura (chozi mdogo)
- Amani sunbird, Hedydipna pallidigaster (chozi-pwani) (endangered)
- Green-headed sunbird, Cyanomitra verticalis (neli kichwa-kijani)
- Blue-throated brown sunbird, Cyanomitra cyanolaema (neli koo-buluu)
- Olive sunbird, Cyanomitra olivacea (neli zeituni mashariki)
- Mouse-colored sunbird, Cyanomitra veroxii (neli kijivu)
- Green-throated sunbird, Chalcomitra rubescens (neli koo-kijani)
- Amethyst sunbird, Chalcomitra amethystina (neli mweusi)
- Scarlet-chested sunbird, Chalcomitra senegalensis (neli gunda)
- Hunter's sunbird, Chalcomitra hunteri (neli kidari-chekundu)
- Tacazze sunbird, Nectarinia tacazze (neli yakuti)
- Bronze sunbird, Nectarinia kilimensis (neli shaba)
- Malachite sunbird, Nectarinia famosa (neli kijani)
- Red-tufted sunbird, Nectarinia johnstoni (neli mabaka-mekundu)
- Golden-winged sunbird, Drepanorhynchus reichenowi (neli mabawa-dhahabu)
- Olive-bellied sunbird, Cinnyris chloropygius (chozi tumbo-zeituni)
- Northern double-collared sunbird, Cinnyris reichenowi (chozi mikufu-miwili kaskazi)
- Eastern double-collared sunbird, Cinnyris mediocris (chozi mikufu-miwili)
- Usambara double-collared sunbird, Cinnyris usambaricus (chozi wa Usambara) (near-threatened)
- Beautiful sunbird, Cinnyris pulchellus (chozi mzuri)
- Mariqua sunbird, Cinnyris mariquensis (chozi wa Mariko)
- Red-chested sunbird, Cinnyris erythrocerca (chozi kidari-chekundu)
- Black-bellied sunbird, Cinnyris nectarinioides (chozi tumbo-jeusi)
- Purple-banded sunbird, Cinnyris bifasciatus (chozi mkufu-zambarau)
- Tsavo sunbird, Cinnyris tsavoensis (chozi wa Tsavo)
- Violet-breasted sunbird, Cinnyris chalcomelas (chozi kidari-zambarau)
- Orange-tufted sunbird, Cinnyris bouvieri (chozi mabaka-machungwa)
- Shining sunbird, Cinnyris habessinicus (chozi Habeshi)
- Superb sunbird, Cinnyris superbus (chozi maridadi)
- Variable sunbird, Cinnyris venustus (chozi tumbo-njano)
- Copper sunbird, Cinnyris cupreus (chozi shaba)

== Weavers and allies ==
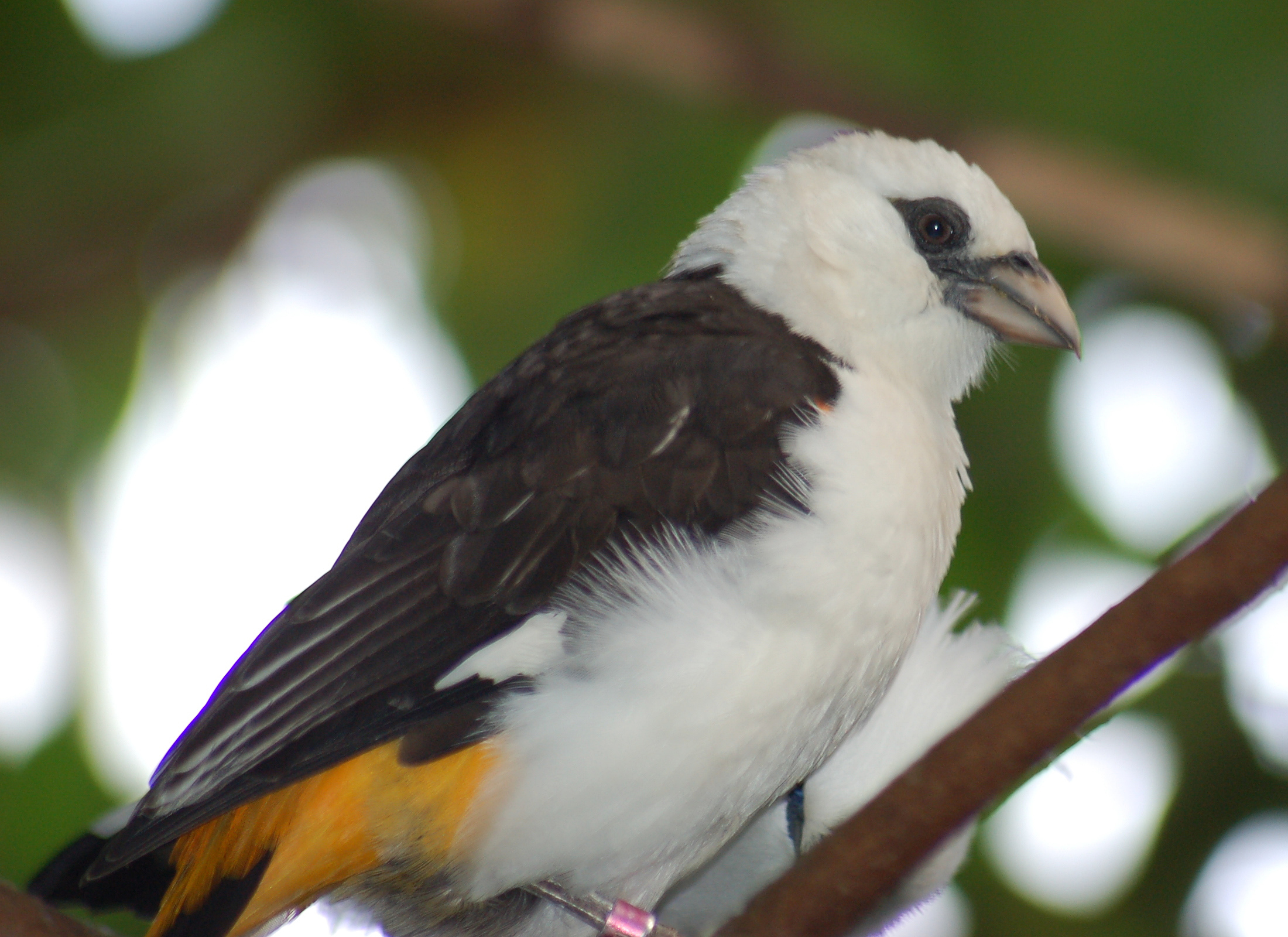
White-headed buffalo-weaver

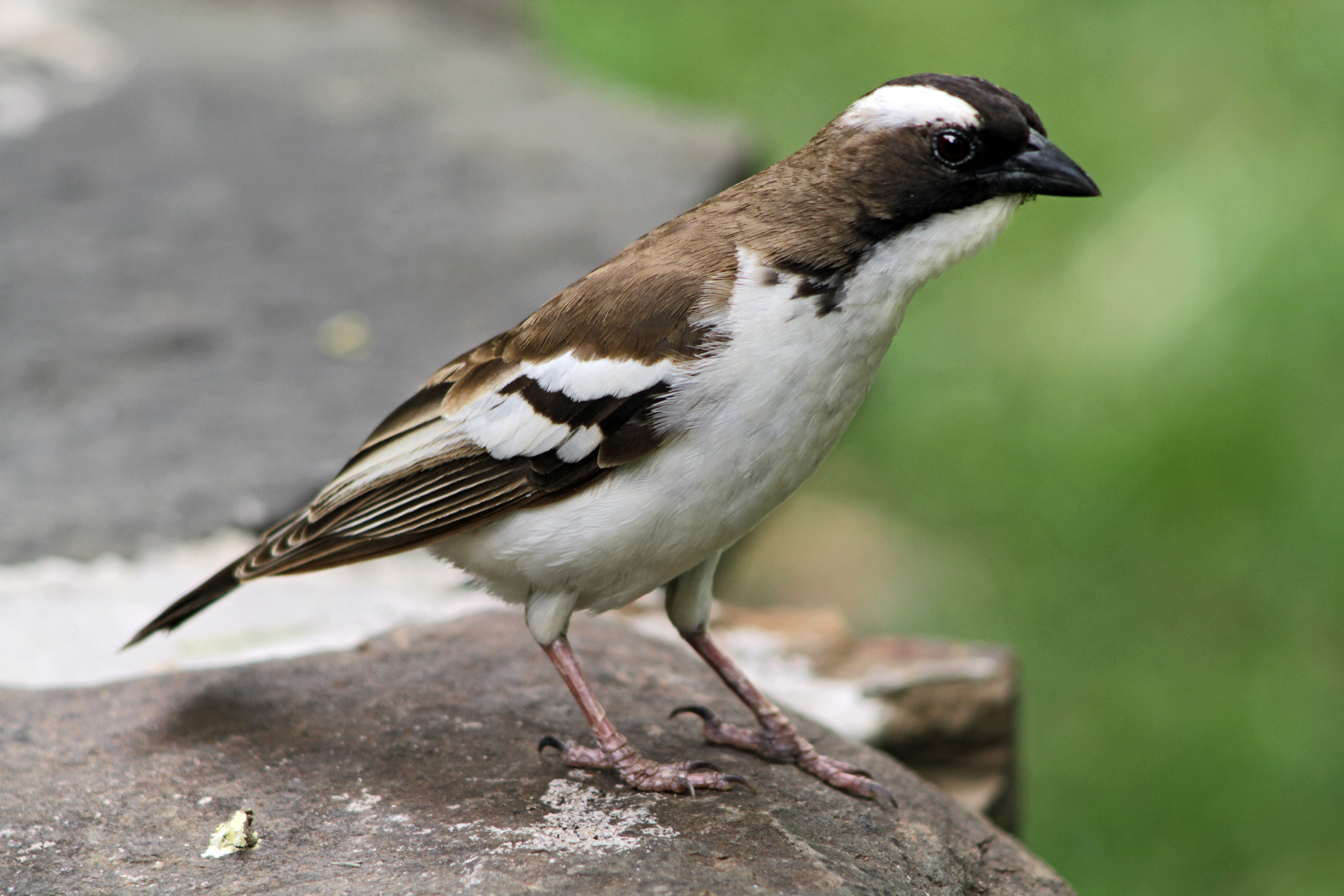
White-browed sparrow-weaver

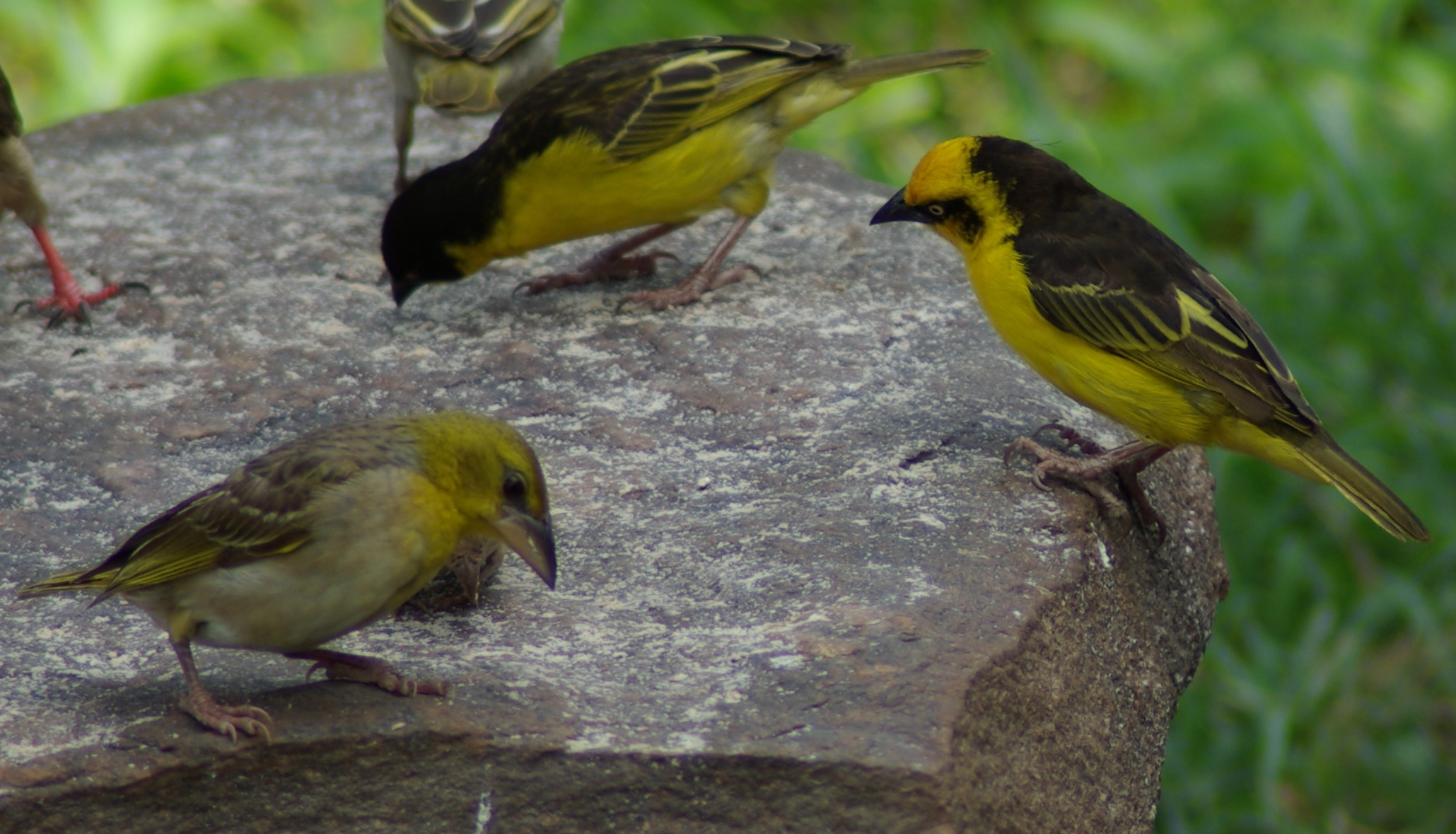
These baglafecht weavers (black and yellow) and village weaver (pale) gathered at a feeder at the Masai Mara.

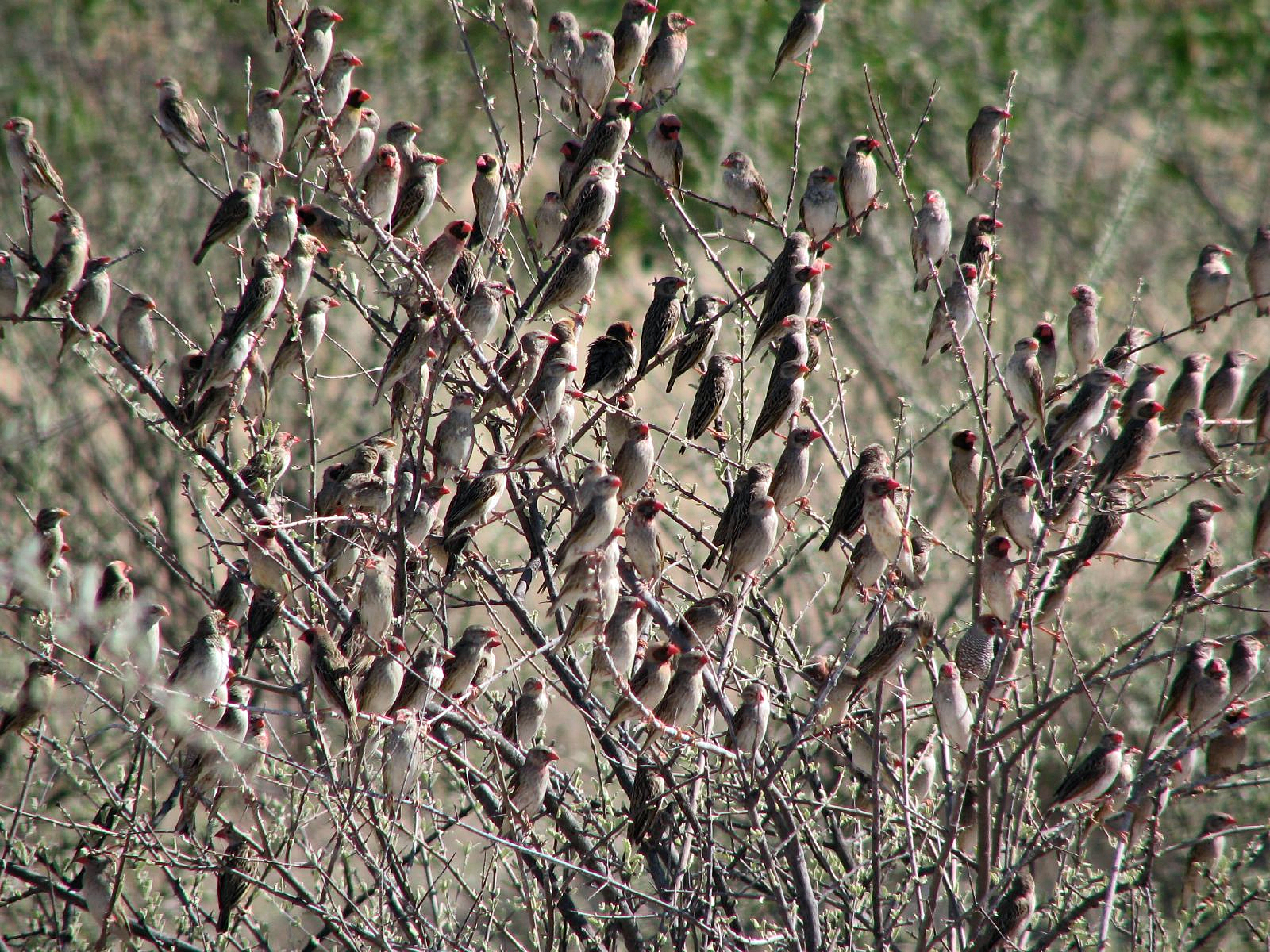
The red-billed quelea frequently occurs in swarming, wandering flocks in Kenya.

Order: Passeriformes Family: Ploceidae

The weavers are small passerine birds related to the finches. They are seed-eating birds with rounded conical bills. The males of many species are brightly colored, usually in red or yellow and black, though some species show variation in color only in the breeding season.

- White-billed buffalo-weaver, Bubalornis albirostris (manofi domo-jeupe)
- Red-billed buffalo-weaver, Bubalornis niger (manofi domo-jekundu)
- White-headed buffalo-weaver, Dinemellia dinemelli (manofi kichwa-cheupe)
- Speckle-fronted weaver, Sporopipes frontalis (korobindo paji-madoa)
- White-browed sparrow-weaver, Plocepasser mahali (korobindo nyusi-nyeupe)
- Chestnut-crowned sparrow-weaver, Plocepasser superciliosus (korobindo utosi-mwekundu)
- Donaldson-Smith's sparrow-weaver, Plocepasser donaldsoni (korobindo wa Donaldson)
- Rufous-tailed weaver, Histurgops ruficauda (korobindo mkia-mwekundu) (A)
- Gray-headed social-weaver, Pseudonigrita arnaudi (korobindo utosi-kijivu)
- Black-capped social-weaver, Pseudonigrita cabanisi (korobindo utosi-mweusi)
- Red-headed malimbe, Malimbus rubricollis (pasha kitunga)
- Red-headed weaver, Anaplectes rubriceps (kwera kichwa-chekundu)
- Red weaver, Anaplectes jubaensis (kwera mwekundu)
- Baglafecht weaver, Ploceus baglafecht (kwera wa Baglafecht)
- Little weaver, Ploceus luteolus (kwera mdogo)
- Slender-billed weaver, Ploceus pelzelni (kwera domo-jembamba)
- Black-necked weaver, Ploceus nigricollis (kwera koo-jeusi)
- Spectacled weaver, Ploceus ocularis (kwera miwani)
- Black-billed weaver, Ploceus melanogaster (kwera kichwa-njano)
- African golden-weaver, Ploceus subaureus (mnana tumbo-dhahabu)
- Holub's golden-weaver, Ploceus xanthops (mnana mkubwa)
- Orange weaver, Ploceus aurantius (mnana machungwa) (A)
- Golden palm weaver, Ploceus bojeri (mnana-minazi)
- Taveta golden-weaver, Ploceus castaneiceps (mnana wa Taveta)
- Northern brown-throated weaver, Ploceus castanops (mnana-mafunjo)
- Northern masked-weaver, Ploceus taeniopterus (kwera paji-jeusi)
- Lesser masked-weaver, Ploceus intermedius (kwera macho-njano)
- Vitelline masked-weaver, Ploceus vitellinus (kwera paji-jekundu)
- Heuglin's masked-weaver, Ploceus heuglini (kwera wa Heuglin)
- Rüppell's weaver, Ploceus galbula (kwera wa Rüppell) (A)
- Speke's weaver, Ploceus spekei (kwera kidari-kahawia)
- Vieillot's black weaver, Ploceus nigerrimus (kwera mweusi)
- Village weaver, Ploceus cucullatus (kwera nguya)
- Weyns's weaver, Ploceus weynsi (kwera wa Weyns) (A)
- Clarke's weaver, Ploceus golandi (kwera wa Clarke) (E) (endangered)
- Salvadori's weaver, Ploceus dichrocephalus (kwera wa Juba)
- Black-headed weaver, Ploceus melanocephalus (kwera mgongo-njano)
- Golden-backed weaver, Ploceus jacksoni (kwera mgongo-dhahabu)
- Chestnut weaver, Ploceus rubiginosus (kwera kahawianyekundu)
- Forest weaver, Ploceus bicolor (kwera rangi-mbili)
- Yellow-mantled weaver, Ploceus tricolor (kwera rangi-tatu) (A)
- Brown-capped weaver, Ploceus insignis (kwera utosi-kahawia)
- Compact weaver, Pachyphantes superciliosus (kwera domo-nene)
- Cardinal quelea, Quelea cardinalis (kwelea kidari-chekundu)
- Red-headed quelea, Quelea erythrops (kwelea kichwa-chekundu)
- Red-billed quelea, Quelea quelea (kwelea domo-jekundu)
- Northern red bishop, Euplectes franciscanus (kweche machungwa)
- Southern red bishop, Euplectes orix (kweche mwekundu)
- Zanzibar red bishop, Euplectes nigroventris (kweche-pwani)
- Black-winged bishop, Euplectes hordeaceus (kweche mtama)
- Black bishop, Euplectes gierowii (kweche mweusi)
- Yellow-crowned bishop, Euplectes afer (kweche kichwa-njano)
- Fire-fronted bishop, Euplectes diadematus (kweche paji-jekundu)
- Yellow bishop, Euplectes capensis (kweche manjano)
- White-winged widowbird, Euplectes albonotatus (kweche mabawa-meupe)
- Yellow-mantled widowbird, Euplectes macroura (kweche mgongo-njano)
- Red-collared widowbird, Euplectes ardens (kweche kisogo-chekundu)
- Red-cowled widowbird, Euplectes laticauda (kweche ?????)
- Fan-tailed widowbird, Euplectes axillaris (kweche mkia-mpana)
- Marsh widowbird, Euplectes hartlaubi (kweche-mabwawa)
- Long-tailed widowbird, Euplectes progne (kweche mkia-mrefu)
- Jackson's widowbird, Euplectes jacksoni (kweche-wanda) (near-threatened)
- Grosbeak weaver, Amblyospiza albifrons (yombeyombe)

== Waxbills and allies ==
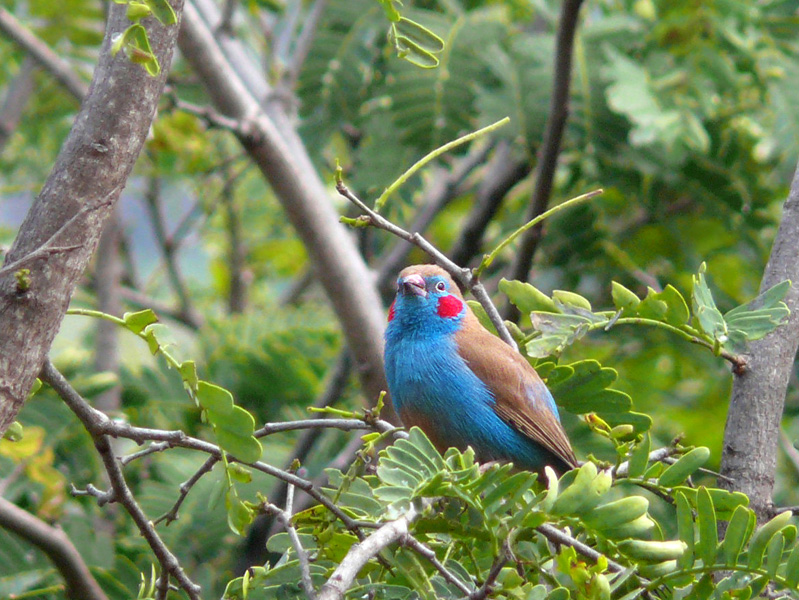
Red-cheeked cordon-bleu

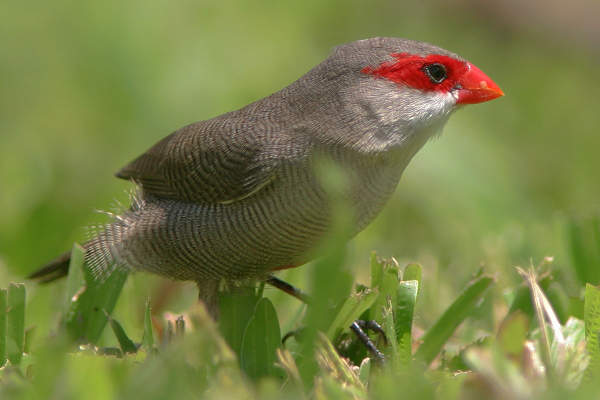
Common waxbill

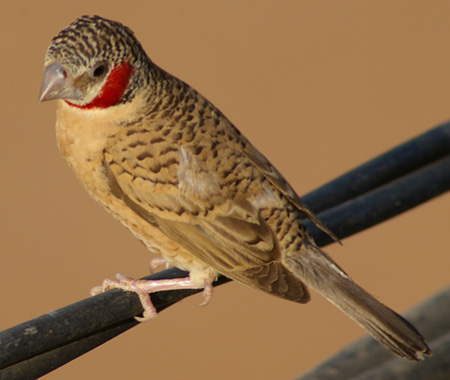
Cut-throat

Order: Passeriformes Family: Estrildidae

The estrildid finches are small passerine birds of the Old World tropics and Australasia. They are gregarious and often colonial seed eaters with short, thick but pointed bills. They are similar in structure and habits, but have wide variation in plumage colors and patterns.

- Gray-headed silverbill, Spermestes griseicapilla (tongo kichwa-kijivu)
- Bronze mannikin, Spermestes cucullata (tongo pofu)
- Magpie mannikin, Spermestes fringilloides (tongo simba) (A)
- Black-and-white mannikin, Spermestes bicolor (tongo rangi-mbili)
- African silverbill, Euodice cantans (tongo mgongo-fedha)
- Yellow-bellied waxbill, Coccopygia quartinia (mshigi tujmbo-njano)
- Green-backed twinspot, Mandingoa nitidula (mtolondo-kanga mgongo-kijani)
- Abyssinian crimsonwing, Cryptospiza salvadorii (mtolondo-misitu Habeshi)
- White-breasted nigrita, Nigrita fusconotus (njiri kidari-cheupe)
- Chestnut-breasted nigrita, Nigrita bicolor (njiri kidari-kahawiachekundu)
- Gray-headed nigrita, Nigrita canicapillus (njiri utosi-kijivu)
- Black-faced waxbill, Brunhilda erythronotos (mshigi uso-meusi)
- Black-cheeked waxbill, Brunhilda charmosyna (mshigi mashavu-meusi)
- Black-crowned waxbill, Estrilda nonnula (mshigi utosi-mweusi)
- Kandt's waxbill, Estrilda kandti (mshigi wa Kandt)
- Fawn-breasted waxbill, Estrilda paludicola (mshigi-mbuga)
- Common waxbill, Estrilda astrild (mshigi kinyago-chekundu)
- Black-rumped waxbill, Estrilda troglodytes (mshigi kiuno-cheusi)
- Crimson-rumped waxbill, Estrilda rhodopyga (mshigi kiuno-chekundu)
- Quailfinch, Ortygospiza fuscocrissa (mshigi tombo)
- Locustfinch, Paludipasser locustella (mshigi kidari-chekundu)
- Cut-throat, Amadina fasciata (tararita)
- Zebra waxbill, Amandava subflava (mshigi punda-milia)
- Purple grenadier, Granatina ianthinogaster (tunguhina kaskazi)
- Southern cordonbleu, Uraeginthus angolensis (kitenduli mashavu-bvuluu) (A)
- Red-cheeked cordonbleu, Uraeginthus bengalus (kitenduli mashavu-mekundu)
- Blue-capped cordonbleu, Uraeginthus cyanocephalus (kitenduli kichwa-buluu)
- Red-headed bluebill, Spermophaga ruficapilla (domobuluu kichwa-chekundu)
- Black-bellied seedcracker, Pyrenestes ostrinus (mbanjambegu tumbo-jeusi)
- Green-winged pytilia, Pytilia melba (tunguridi mabawa-kijani)
- Orange-winged pytilia, Pytilia afra (tunguridi mabawa-machungwa)
- Peters's twinspot, Hypargos niveoguttatus (mtolondo-kanga koo-jekundu)
- Brown twinspot, Clytospiza monteiri (mtolondo-kanga mgongo-kahawia)
- Red-billed firefinch, Lagonosticta senegala (mtolondo domo-jekundu)
- African firefinch, Lagonosticta rubricata (mtolondo biliwili)
- Jameson's firefinch, Lagonosticta rhodopareia (mtolondo wa Jameson)
- Black-bellied firefinch, Lagonosticta rara (mtolondo tumbo-jeusi)
- Bar-breasted firefinch, Lagonosticta rufopicta (mtolondo kidari-madoa)
- Black-faced firefinch, Lagonosticta larvata (mtolondo uso-mweusi)

== Indigobirds ==
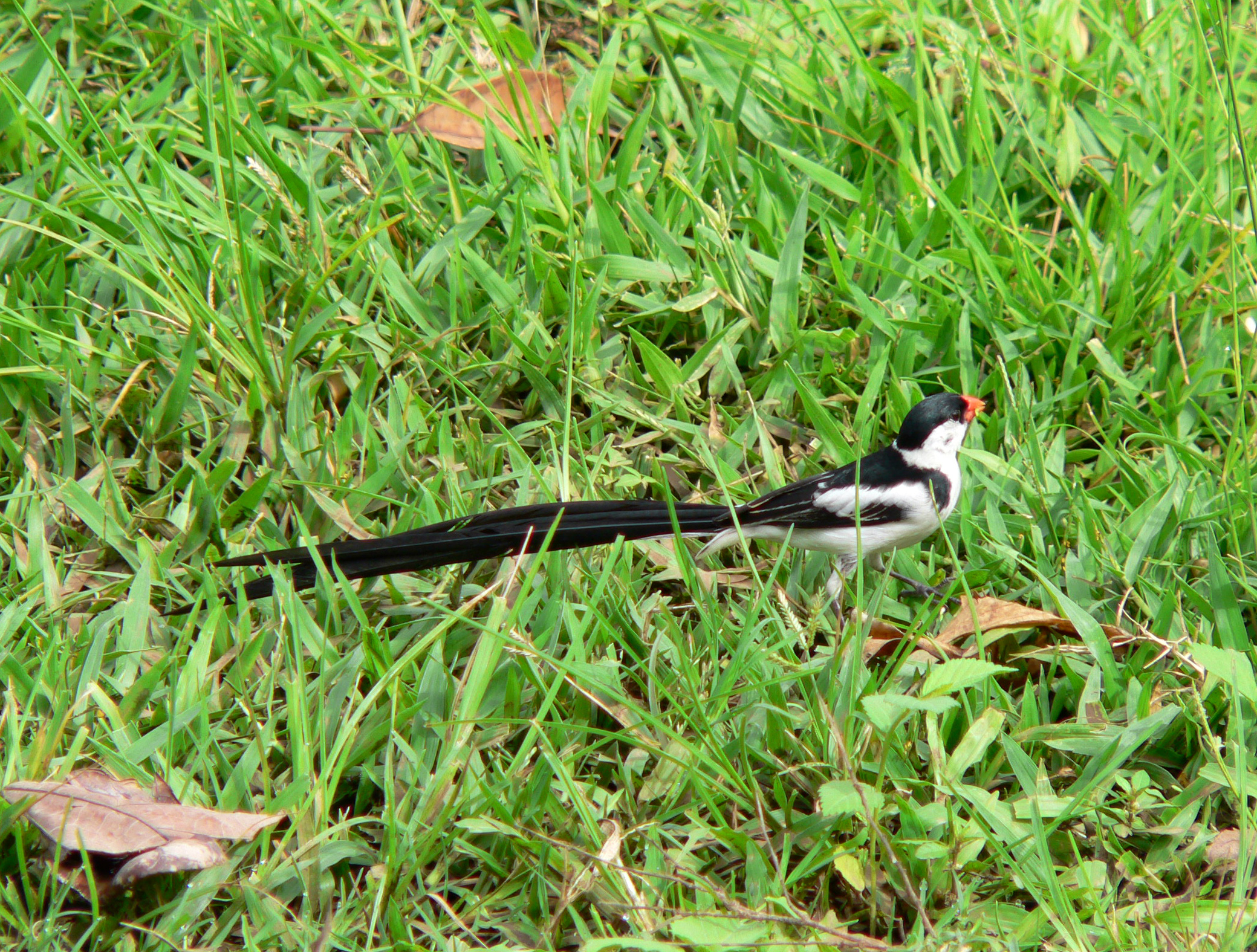
The breeding male pin-tailed whydah is one of Kenya's most spectacular birds.

Order: Passeriformes Family: Viduidae

The indigobirds are finch-like species which usually have black or indigo predominating in their plumage. All are brood parasites, which lay their eggs in the nests of estrildid finches.

- Pin-tailed whydah, Vidua macroura (fumbwe mkia-mwembamba)
- Broad-tailed paradise-whydah, Vidua obtusa (fumbwe mkia-mpana) (A)
- Eastern paradise-whydah, Vidua paradisaea (fumbwe mkia-mrefu)
- Steel-blue whydah, Vidua hypocherina (fumbwe buluu)
- Straw-tailed whydah, Vidua fischeri (fumbwe mkia-njano)
- Village indigobird, Vidua chalybeata (kinili-kaya)
- Variable indigobird, Vidua funerea (kinili mweusi)
- Purple indigobird, Vidua purpurascens (kinili miguu-myeupe)
- Parasitic weaver, Anomalospiza imberbis (yombeyombe manjano)

== Old World sparrows ==
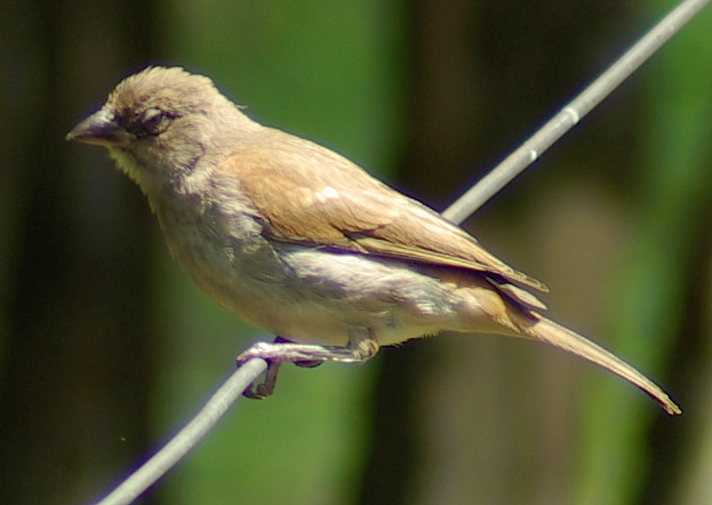
Swahili sparrow

Order: Passeriformes Family: Passeridae

Sparrows are small passerine birds. In general, sparrows tend to be small, plump, brown or gray birds with short tails and short powerful beaks. Sparrows are seed eaters, but they also consume small insects.

- House sparrow, Passer domesticus (shomoro-kaya) (I)
- Somali sparrow, Passer castanopterus (shomoro Somali)
- Kenya rufous sparrow, Passer rufocinctus (shomoro mwekundu)
- Shelley's rufous sparrow, Passer shelleyi (shomoro wa Shelley)
- Northern gray-headed sparrow, Passer griseus (shomoro jurawa)
- Swainson's sparrow, Passer swainsonii (jurawa wa Swainson)
- Parrot-billed sparrow, Passer gongonensis (jurawa domo-nene)
- Swahili sparrow, Passer suahelicus (jiurawa Swahili)
- Chestnut sparrow, Passer eminibey (shomoro kahawianyekundu)
- Yellow-spotted bush sparrow, Gymnoris pyrgita (korobindo madoa-njano)

== Wagtails and pipits ==
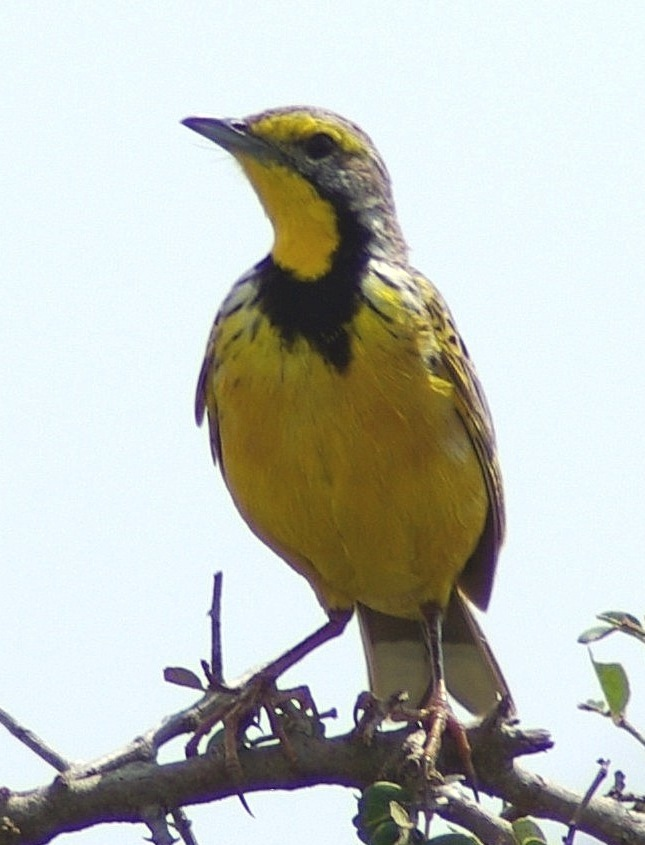
The yellow-throated longclaw, this one photographed in Sweetwaters Game Reserve, occurs in southwestern and south-central Kenya and on the coast.

Order: Passeriformes Family: Motacillidae

Motacillidae is a family of small passerine birds with medium to long tails. They include the wagtails, longclaws, and pipits. They are slender ground-feeding insectivores of open country.

- Cape wagtail, Motacilla capensis (tikisa kusi)
- Mountain wagtail, Motacilla clara (tikisa-milimna)
- Gray wagtail, Motacilla cinerea (tikisa kijivu)
- Western yellow wagtail, Motacilla flava (tikisa njano)
- African pied wagtail, Motacilla aguimp (tikisa-majumba)
- White wagtail, Motacilla alba (tikisa mweupe)
- African pipit, Anthus cinnamomeus (kipimanjia-mbuga)
- Long-billed pipit, Anthus similis (kipimanjia domo-refu)
- Tawny pipit, Anthus campestris (kipimanjia hudhurungi)
- Plain-backed pipit, Anthus leucophrys (kipimanjia nyusi-nyeupe)
- Buffy pipit, Anthus vaalensis (kipimanjia kijivucheupe)
- Malindi pipit, Anthus melindae (kipimanjia wa Malindi)
- Striped pipit, Anthus lineiventris (kipimanjia tumbo-michirizi)
- Tree pipit, Anthus trivialis (kipimanjia mpendamiti)
- Red-throated pipit, Anthus cervinus (kipimanjia koo-jekundu)
- Bush pipit, Anthus caffer (kipimanjia mdogo)
- Sokoke pipit, Anthus sokokensis (kipimanjia wa Sokoke) (endangered)
- Golden pipit, Tmetothylacus tenellus (shani)
- Sharpe's longclaw, Hemimacronyx sharpei (tokeeo wa Sharpe) (E) (endangered)
- Yellow-throated longclaw, Macronyx croceus (tokeeo koo-njano)
- Pangani longclaw, Macronyx aurantiigula (tokeeo koo-dhahabu)
- Rosy-throated longclaw, Macronyx ameliae (tokeeo koo-jekundu)

== Finches, euphonias, and allies ==
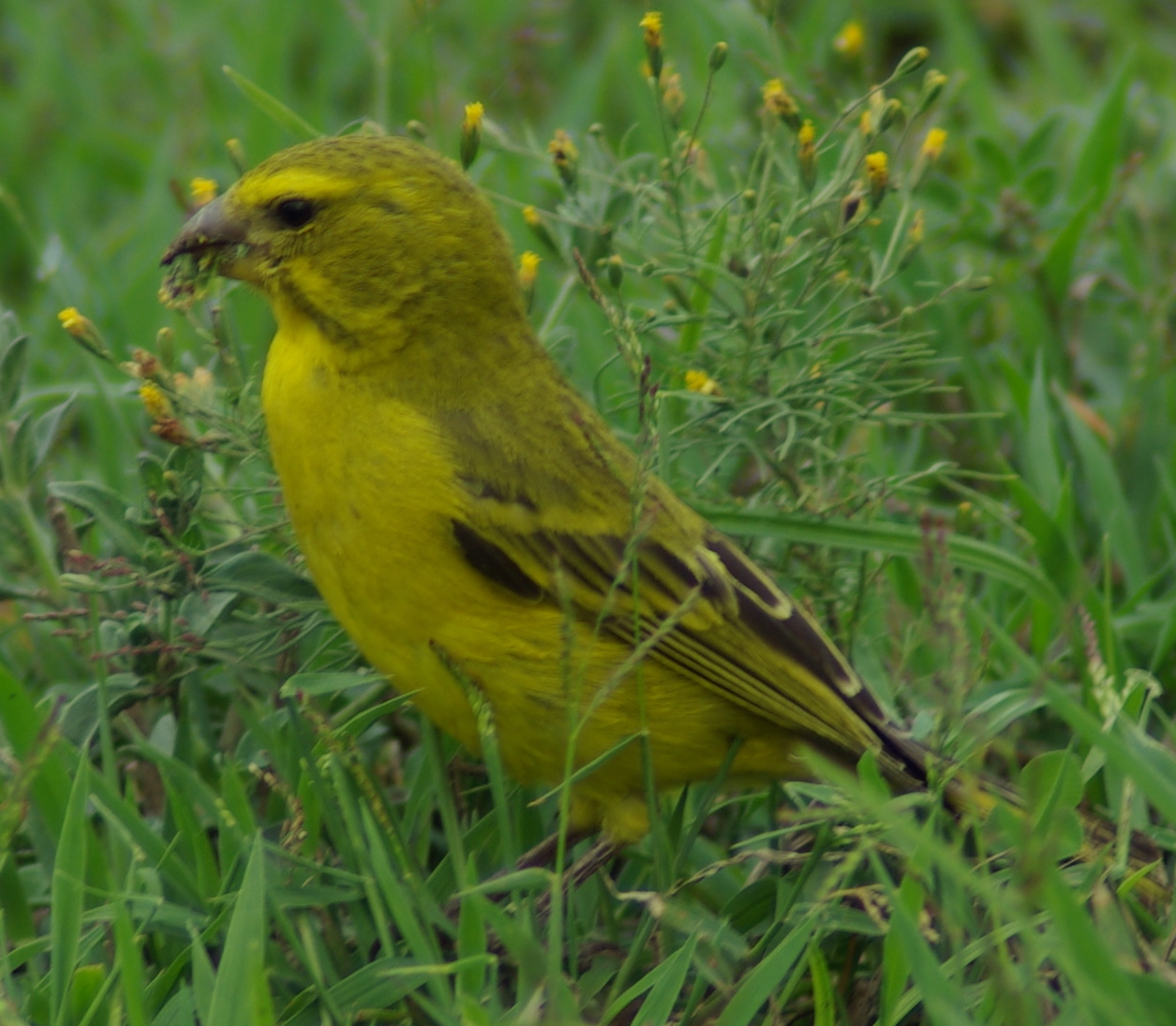
The brimstone canary stands out even in its grassland habitat.

Order: Passeriformes Family: Fringillidae

Finches are seed-eating passerine birds that are small to moderately large and have a strong beak, usually conical and in some species very large. All have twelve tail feathers and nine primaries. These birds have a bouncing flight with alternating bouts of flapping and gliding on closed wings, and most sing well.

- Oriole finch, Linurgus olivaceus (chiriku mshigi)
- Yellow-fronted canary, Crithagra mozambica (chiriku uso-njano)
- African citril, Crithagra citrinelloides (chiriku mdogo)
- Western citril, Crithagra frontalis (chiriku uso-mweupe) (A)
- Southern citril, Crithagra hyposticta (chiriku uso-kijivu)
- Papyrus canary, Crithagra koliensis (chiriku-mafunjo)
- Black-throated canary, Crithagra atrogularis (mpasuambegu koo-jeusi)
- Reichenow's seedeater, Crithagra reichenowi (mpasuambegu kiuno-njano wa Kenya)
- White-bellied canary, Crithagra dorsostriata (chiriku tumbo-jeupe)
- Northern grosbeak-canary, Crithagra donaldsoni (chiriku domo-nene kaskazi)
- Southern grosbeak-canary, Crithagra buchanani (chiriku domo-nene kusi)
- Brimstone canary, Crithagra sulphurata (chiriku manjano)
- Streaky seedeater, Crithagra striolata (mpasuambegu michirizi)
- Thick-billed seedeater, Crithagra burtoni (mpasuambegu domo-nene)
- West African seedeater, Crithagra canicapilla (mpasuambegu magharibi)
- Reichard's seedeater, Crithagra reichardi (mpasuambegu kidari-michirizi)
- Yellow-crowned canary, Serinus flavivertex (chiriku utosi-njano)

== Old World buntings ==
Order: Passeriformes Family: Emberizidae

The emberizids are a large family of passerine birds. They are seed-eating birds with distinctively shaped bills. Many emberizid species have distinctive head patterns.

- Brown-rumped bunting, Emberiza affinis (kibarabara tumbo-njano) (A)
- Ortolan bunting, Emberiza hortulana (kibarabara kichwa-kijivu) (A)
- Golden-breasted bunting, Emberiza flaviventris (kibarabara kidari-machungwa)
- Somali bunting, Emberiza poliopleura (kibarabara Somali)
- Cinnamon-breasted bunting, Emberiza tahapisi (kibarabara tumbo-marungi)
- Gosling's bunting, Emberiza goslingi (kibarabara koo-kijivu) (A)
- Striolated bunting, Emberiza striolata (kibarabara michirizi)

== See also ==
- List of birds
- Lists of birds by region
