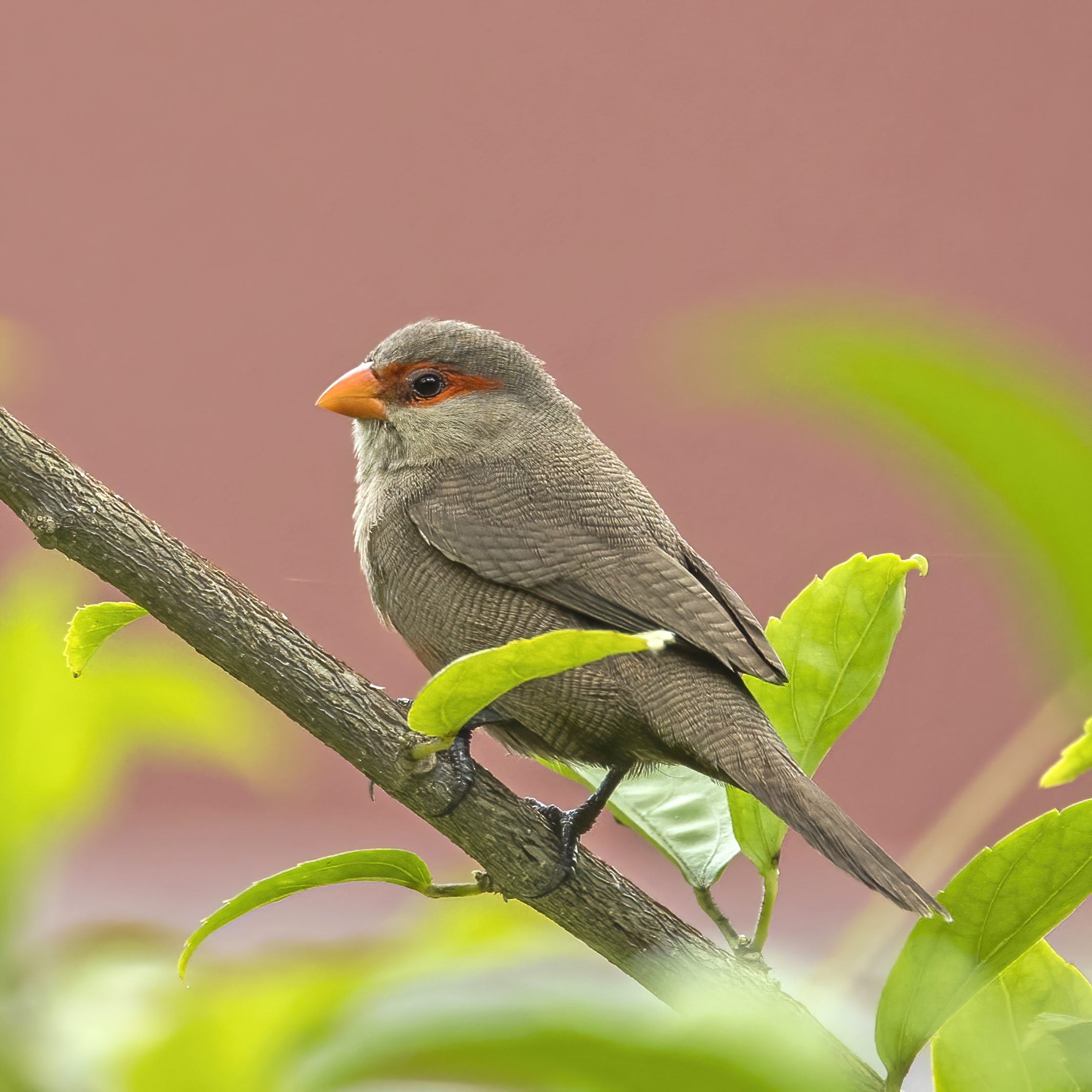
- E. a. jagoensis São Tomé and Príncipe

Conservation status
- Least Concern (IUCN 3.1)

Scientific classification
- Kingdom: Animalia
- Phylum: Chordata
- Class: Aves
- Order: Passeriformes
- Family: Estrildidae
- Genus: Estrilda
- Species: E. astrild

Binomial name
- Estrilda astrild (Linnaeus, 1758)

Synonyms
- Loxia astrild Linnaeus, 1758

= Common waxbill =

Species of bird

The common waxbill (Estrilda astrild), also known as the St Helena waxbill, is a small passerine bird belonging to the estrildid finch family. It is native to sub-Saharan Africa but has been introduced to many other regions of the world and now has an estimated global extent of occurrence of 10,000,000 km^{2}. It is popular and easy to keep in captivity.

== Taxonomy ==
The common waxbill was formally described by the Swedish naturalist Carl Linnaeus in 1758 in the tenth edition of his Systema Naturae under the binomial name Loxia astrild. The etymology of astrild is uncertain. It may either be from a German or Dutch avicultural term for a waxbill or alternatively it may be a misprint for Estrilda. Linnaeus based his description on the "Wax Bill" that had been described and illustrated in 1751 by the English naturalist George Edwards in his A Natural History of Uncommon Birds. Linnaeus specified the locality as "Canaries, America, Africa" but this was restricted to Cape Town in South Africa by William Lutley Sclater and Cyril Mackworth-Praed in 1918. This species is now placed in the genus Estrilda that was introduced in 1827 by the English naturalist William Swainson.

There are 15 recognised subspecies:

- E. a. kempi Bates, GL, 1930 – Guinea, Sierra Leone and Liberia
- E. a. occidentalis Jardine & Fraser, 1852 – south Mali and Ivory Coast to north DR Congo and Bioko Island
- E. a. peasei Shelley, 1903 – Ethiopia
- E. a. macmillani Ogilvie-Grant, 1907 – Sudan
- E. a. adesma Reichenow, 1916 – east DR Congo, Uganda, west Kenya to northwest Tanzania
- E. a. massaica Neumann, 1907 – central Kenya to north Tanzania
- E. a. minor (Cabanis, 1878) – south Somalia, east Kenya, northeast Tanzania and Zanzibar
- E. a. cavendishi Sharpe, 1900 – south DR Congo and south Tanzania to Zimbabwe and Mozambique
- E. a. niediecki Reichenow, 1916 – central Angola to west Zimbabwe
- E. a. angolensis Reichenow, 1902 – inland west Angola
- E. a. jagoensis Alexander, 1898 – coastal west Angola and São Tomé
- E. a. rubriventris (Vieillot, 1817) – Gabon to northwest Angola
- E. a. damarensis Reichenow, 1902 – Namibia
- E. a. astrild (Linnaeus, 1758) – south Botswana and west, south South Africa
- E. a. tenebridorsa Clancey, 1957 – north, east South Africa

== Description ==
It is a small bird, 9.5–13 centimetres (3.7–5.1 in) long and weighing 6–11 g (0.21–0.39 oz). It has a slender body with short rounded wings and a long graduated tail. The bright red bill of the adult is the colour of sealing wax giving the bird its name. The plumage is mostly grey-brown, finely barred with dark brown. There is a red stripe through the eye and the cheeks and throat are whitish. There is often a pinkish flush to the underparts and a reddish stripe along the centre of the belly depending on the subspecies. The rump is brown and the tail and vent are dark. Females are similar to the males but are paler with less red on the belly. Juveniles are duller with little or no red on the belly, fainter dark barring and a black bill.

Similar species include the black-rumped, crimson-rumped and black-lored waxbills. The black-rumped waxbill is black rather than brown on the rump and has a pale vent (area underneath the tail). The crimson-rumped waxbill has a dark bill, red rump and some red on the wings and tail. The black-lored waxbill, found only in the Democratic Republic of Congo, has a black rather than red stripe through the eye; some authors treat it as a 16th subspecies on common waxbill, as E. astrild nigriloris.

The common waxbill has a variety of twittering and buzzing calls and a distinctive high-pitched flight-call. The simple song is harsh and nasal and descends on the last note.

== Distribution and habitat ==
=== Native range ===
There are about 15 subspecies distributed widely across much of Africa south of the Sahara. They are present in most parts of East, Central and Southern Africa except for regions of desert or dense forest. In West Africa they are more local with the main population centred on Sierra Leone, Liberia and the Ivory Coast. Common waxbills inhabit open country with long grass and rank vegetation. They are often found near water in marshes and among reeds. They can be tame and will enter gardens, parks and farmland.

=== Introduced range ===
Birds have often escaped from captivity or been deliberately released. Breeding populations have become established in many places where the climate is sufficiently warm and where there is a sufficient supply of grass seeds. They are now found on many islands around Africa: Saint Helena, Ascension Island, the Cape Verde Islands, São Tomé and Príncipe, Mauritius, Réunion, Rodrigues, the Seychelles and Ile Amsterdam. They may possibly be native on some of these islands. In Europe the common waxbill has become widespread in Portugal and is spreading through Spain. There are small populations on Madeira and Gran Canaria and it has recently appeared on Tenerife and the Azores. In the Americas waxbills are found in Trinidad, several parts of Brazil and there are a few on Bermuda. In the Pacific there are populations on New Caledonia, Efate Island in Vanuatu, Tahiti and the Hawaiian Islands. In Spain it has been introduced in the largest cities in the last ten years and is now quite commonly seen in Madrid, Barcelona and Valencia, as well as along the Spanish-Portuguese border.

== Behaviour and ecology ==
=== Breeding ===
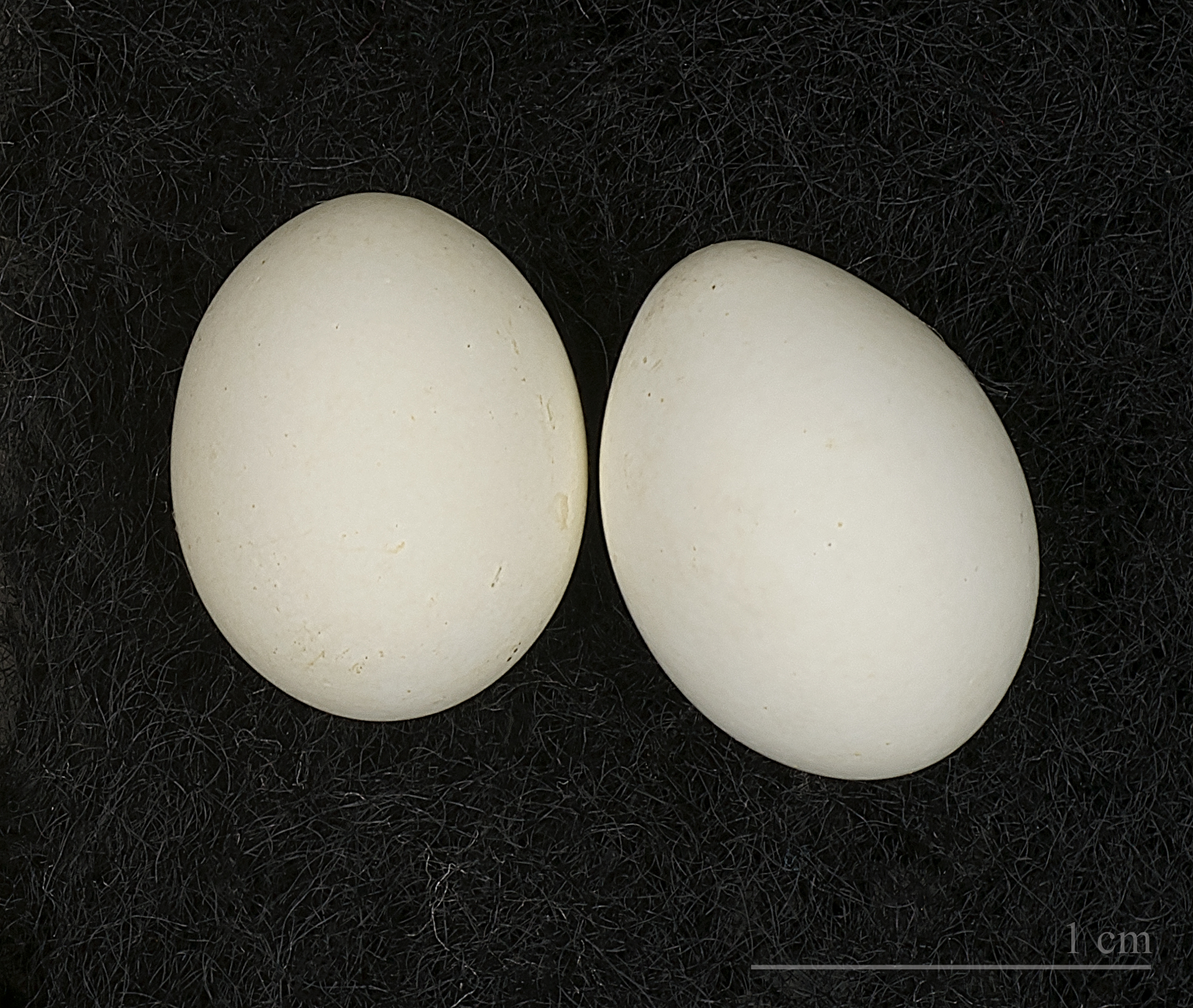
Estrilda astrild - MHNT

The nest is a large ball of criss-crossed grass stems with a long downward-pointing entrance tube on one side. It is built in a cavity, usually low down amongst dense vegetation. A rudimentary second nest ("cock's nest") may be built on top where the male sleeps. Four to seven white eggs are laid. They are incubated for 11 to 13 days and the young birds fledge 17 to 21 days after hatching. Both parents take part in incubating the eggs and feeding the chicks. The timing of the breeding season varies in different parts of the world. Nests may be parasitised by the pin-tailed whydah which lays its eggs in the nests of estrildid finches. In captivity they will breed in an aviary and can raise four broods in a year.

=== Food and feeding ===
The diet consists mainly of grass and millet seeds but insects are also eaten on occasions, especially during the breeding season when more protein is needed. Of these seeds, guinea grasses (Panicum maximum) are perhaps the most important dietary components for waxbills as they have seed heads available year-round. Other important sources include crabgrass (Digitaria horizontalis) and Echinochloa species. The waxbills typically forage in flocks which may contain hundreds or even thousands of birds. They usually feed by clinging to the stems with their long, spindly claws and picking from the flower heads but they will also search for fallen seeds on the ground. They need to drink regularly as the seeds contain little water.

== Picture gallery ==
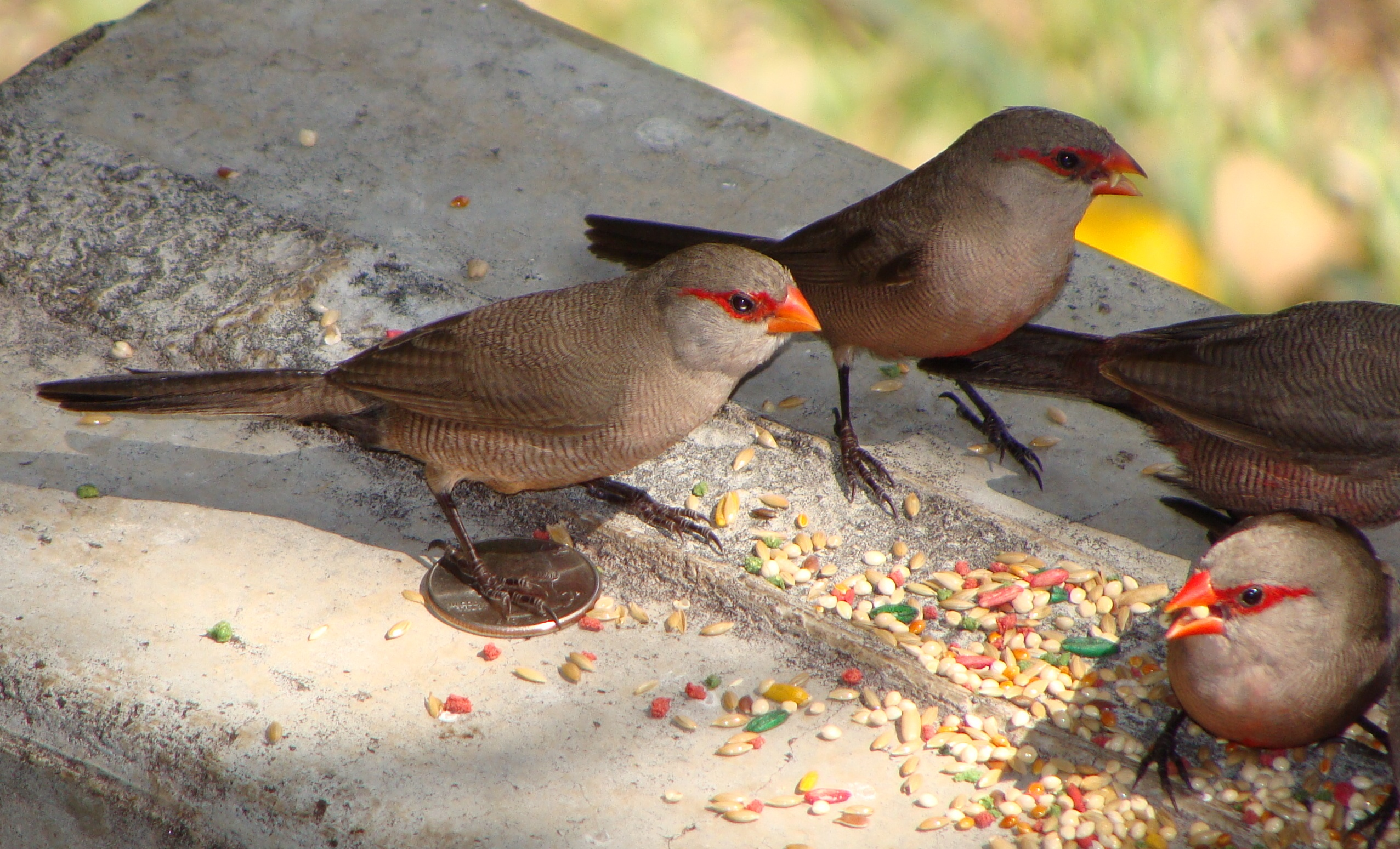
Ascension Island

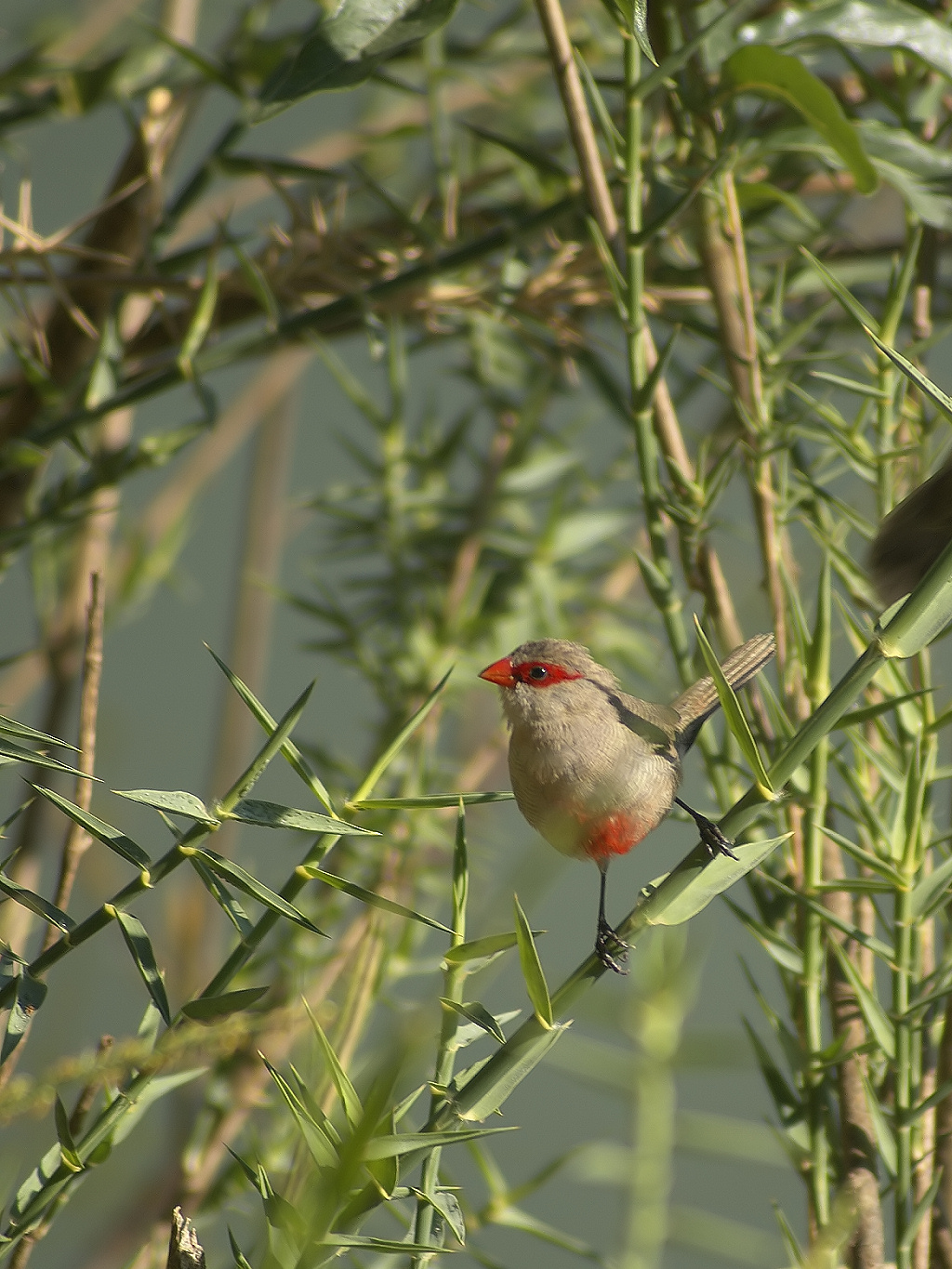
E. a. damarensis
Namibia

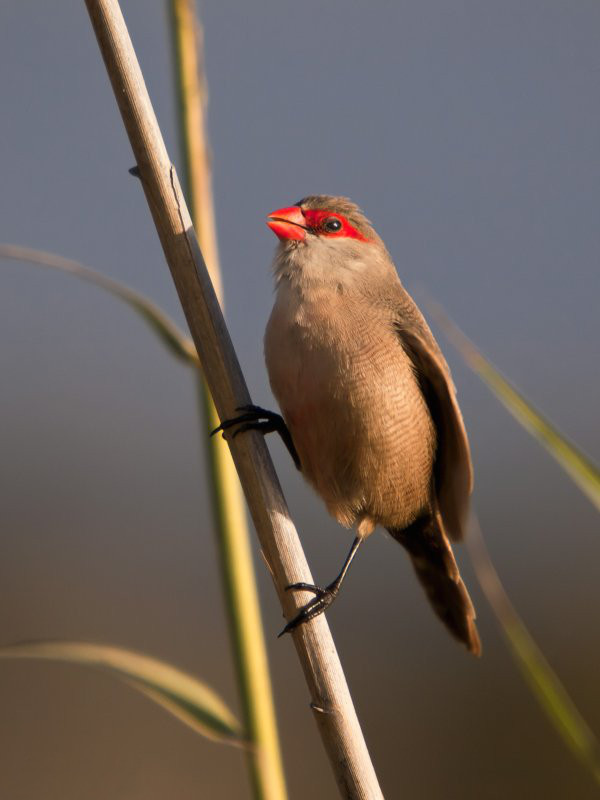
feral adult on Gran Canaria, Canary Islands, Spain

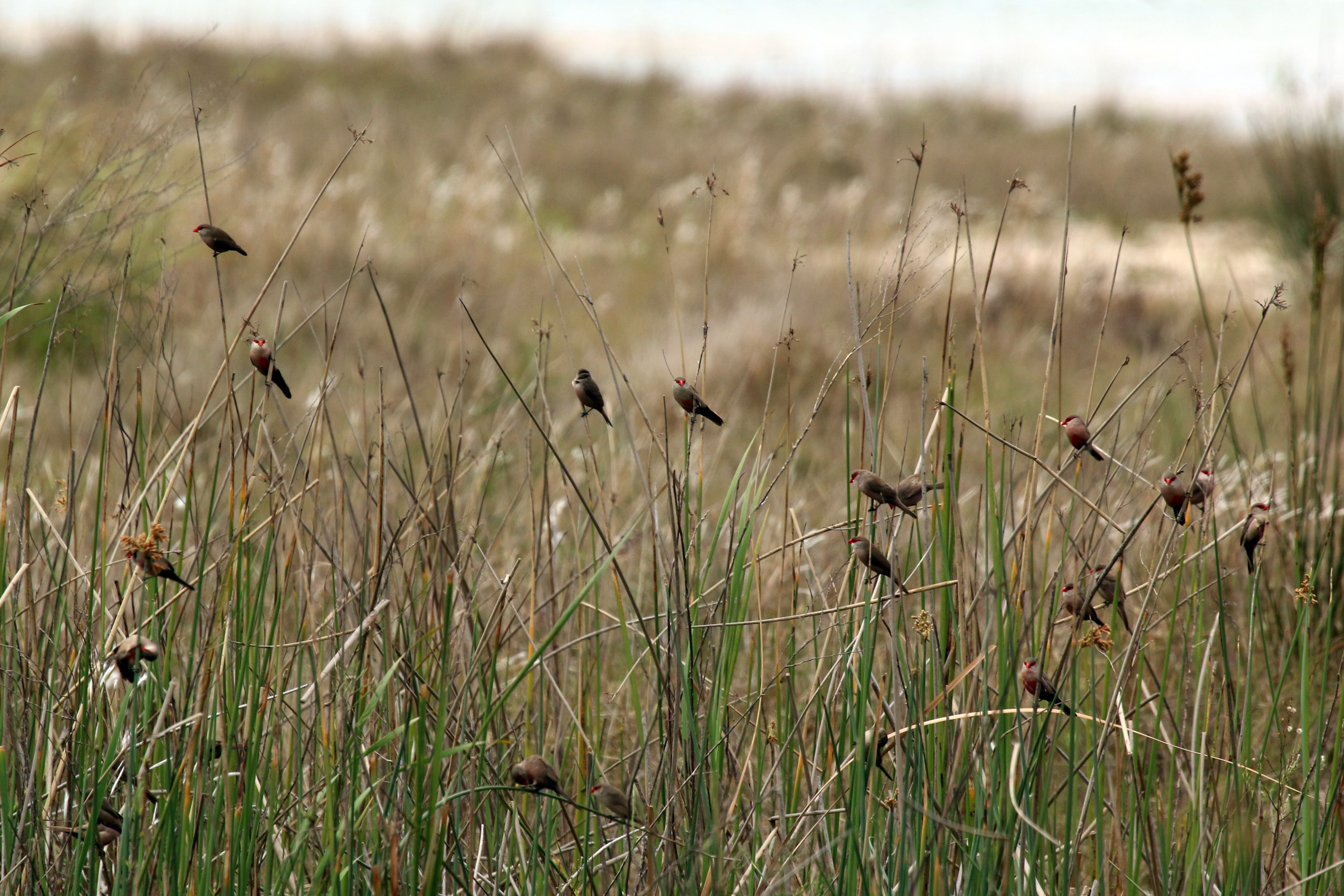
Flock at iSimangaliso Wetland Park, KwaZulu Natal, South Africa
