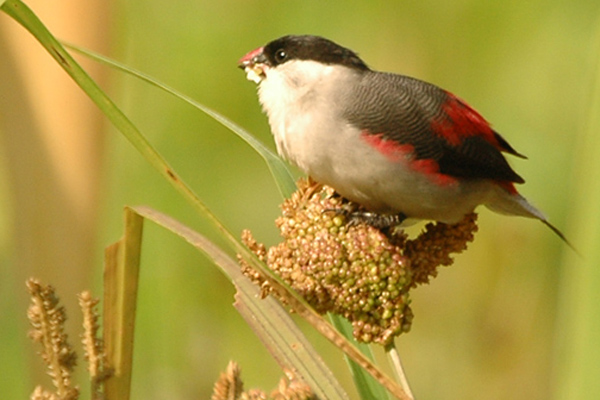
- Black-crowned waxbill (Estrilda nonnula)

Scientific classification
- Kingdom: Animalia
- Phylum: Chordata
- Class: Aves
- Order: Passeriformes
- Family: Estrildidae
- Genus: Estrilda; Swainson, 1827

Type species
- Loxia astrild Common waxbill Linnaeus, 1758

= Estrilda =

Genus of finch in the Estrildidae family

Estrilda is a genus of estrildid finch in the family Estrildidae.

Most of the genus is found in Africa with one species, the Arabian waxbill, ranging into Asia.

Some species are kept as pets and have been accidentally introduced to various parts of the world.

== Taxonomy ==
The genus Estrilda was introduced in 1827 by the English naturalist William Swainson with the common waxbill as the type species. The name of the genus is from astrild, the specific epithet of the common waxbill that was introduced by Carl Linnaeus in 1758.

=== Species ===
The genus contains the following 11 species:

Image	Scientific name	Common name	Distribution
	Black-crowned waxbill	Estrilda nonnula	Nigeria and Cameroon to southeast Sudan, west Kenya and northwest Tanzania
	Black-headed waxbill	Estrilda atricapilla	Angola, Burundi, Cameroon, the Republic of Congo, the Democratic Republic of the Congo, Equatorial Guinea, Gabon, Kenya, Rwanda and Uganda
	Kandt's waxbill	Estrilda kandti	central Africa
	Orange-cheeked waxbill	Estrilda melpoda	Angola, Benin, Bermuda, Burkina Faso, Burundi, Cameroon, Central African Republic, Chad, the Republic of Congo, Côte d'Ivoire, the Democratic Republic of the Congo, Equatorial Guinea, Gabon, Gambia, Ghana, Guinea, Guinea-Bissau, Liberia, Mali, Mauritania, Niger, Nigeria, Puerto Rico, Rwanda, Senegal, Sierra Leone, Togo, and Zambia
	Anambra waxbill	Estrilda poliopareia	southern Nigeria
	Fawn-breasted waxbill	Estrilda paludicola	Angola, Burundi, Central African Republic, the Republic of Congo, the Democratic Republic of the Congo, Ethiopia, Gabon, Kenya, Rwanda, South Sudan, Tanzania, Uganda and Zambia
	Common waxbill	Estrilda astrild	Sierra Leone, Liberia, Ivory Coast, Gabon, Nigeria, Namibia, Angola, South Africa, Botswana, Ethiopia, Tanzania, Malawi, Kenya, Uganda, Rwanda, Burundi, Mozambique, Cameroon
	Black-lored waxbill	Estrilda nigriloris	Democratic Republic of the Congo
	Black-rumped waxbill	Estrilda troglodytes	Benin, Burkina Faso, Cameroon, Central African Republic, Chad, The Democratic Republic of the Congo, Côte d'Ivoire, Eritrea, Ethiopia, France (introduced by Guadeloupe), Gambia, Ghana, Guadeloupe, Guinea, Kenya, Liberia, Mali, Mauritania, Niger, Nigeria, Portugal (introduced), Puerto Rico, Senegal, Sudan, Togo, Uganda
	Crimson-rumped waxbill	Estrilda rhodopyga	Burundi, The Democratic Republic of the Congo, Djibouti, Egypt, Eritrea, South Africa, Ethiopia, Kenya, Malawi, Rwanda, Somalia, Sudan, Tanzania and Uganda
	Arabian waxbill	Estrilda rufibarba	Yemen and southwestern Saudi Arabia

The genus formerly contained other species with "waxbill" in their common name that are now placed in the genera Coccopygia, Brunhilda and Glaucestrilda.
