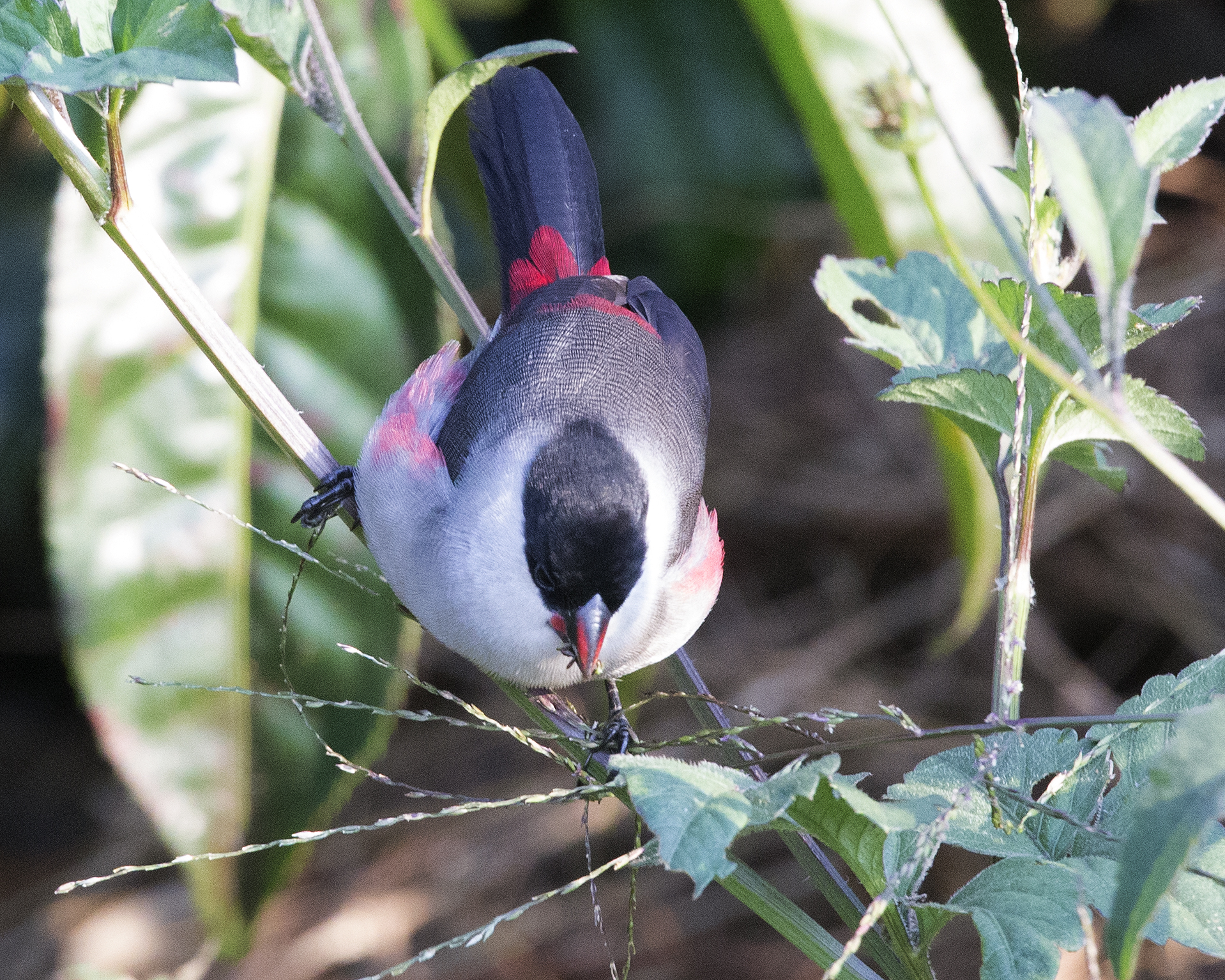

Conservation status
- Least Concern (IUCN 3.1)

Scientific classification
- Kingdom: Animalia
- Phylum: Chordata
- Class: Aves
- Order: Passeriformes
- Family: Estrildidae
- Genus: Estrilda
- Species: E. kandti

Binomial name
- Estrilda kandti Reichenow, 1902

= Kandt's waxbill =

Species of bird

Kandt's waxbill (Estrilda kandti) is a species of estrildid finch found in central Africa. It is sometimes considered conspecific with the black-headed waxbill.
