= Anambra waxbill =

Conservation status
- Near Threatened (IUCN 3.1)

Scientific classification
- Kingdom: Animalia
- Phylum: Chordata
- Class: Aves
- Order: Passeriformes
- Family: Estrildidae
- Genus: Estrilda
- Species: E. poliopareia

Binomial name
- Estrilda poliopareia Reichenow, 1902

Species of bird

The Anambra waxbill (Estrilda poliopareia) is a species of estrildid finch found in wetter land of southern Nigeria and Benin. It has an estimated global extent of occurrence of 38,000 km^{2}.

== Identification ==
The Anambra waxbill is approximately 12 cm long. This species is a dun-coloured finch with reddish brown bill and rump. If looked at closely, it has very fine barring on its upperparts, sides of breast and flanks, with unusual pale eyes. It has a typical waxbill-like tzzzt call.

== Habitat ==
The Anambra waxbill lives in small flocks of up to 20 birds or more. It appears to be found at southern Nigeria, and is known with certainty from only five reported sightings. It is usually found in long grass along rivers, lagoon sandbanks, marshes, swamps and forest. It feeds principally on grass seeds taken from seedheads.

== Conservation measures ==
No conservation measures are undertaken yet. However, it was proposed to conduct population surveys to determine its distribution, habitat requirements and potential threats. It was also proposed to study its behaviour, voice and DNA to clarify its taxonomic relationship with the fawn-breasted waxbill (E. paludicola).
