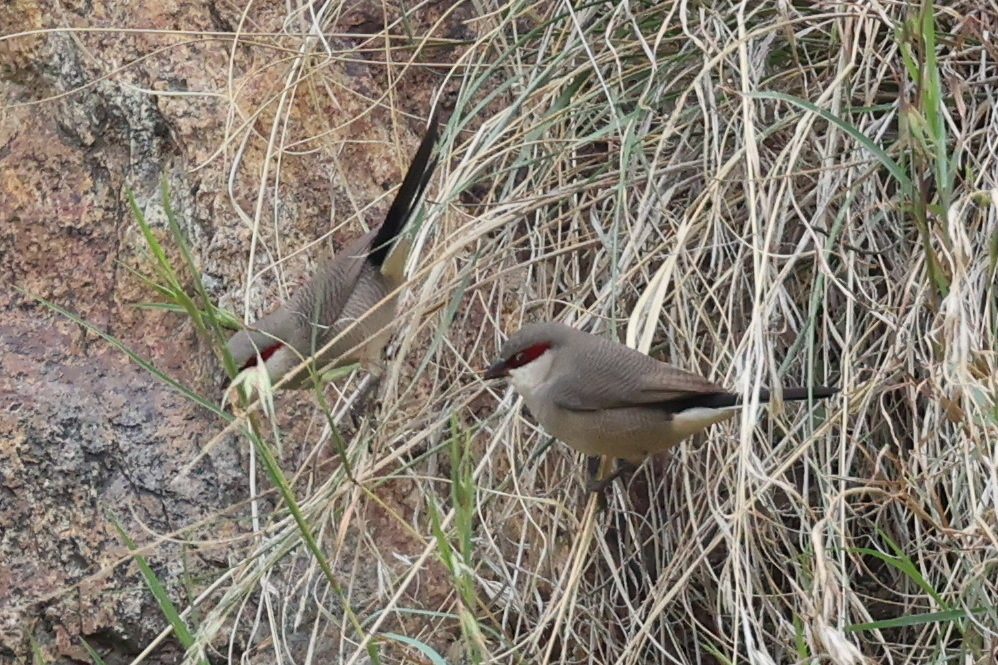

Conservation status
- Least Concern (IUCN 3.1)

Scientific classification
- Kingdom: Animalia
- Phylum: Chordata
- Class: Aves
- Order: Passeriformes
- Family: Estrildidae
- Genus: Estrilda
- Species: E. rufibarba

Binomial name
- Estrilda rufibarba (Cabanis, 1851)

= Arabian waxbill =

Species of bird

The Arabian waxbill (Estrilda rufibarba) is a highly sociable species of estrildid finch native to Yemen and south-western Saudi Arabia. It has an estimated global extent of occurrence of 20,000 – 50,000 km^{2}.

== Habitat ==
The Arabian waxbill is usually found in wetter land of southern Tihamah foothills and the terraced slopes and wadis of the western escarpments in Yemen. It can also be found along the south coast of Yemen east to Wadi al-Jahr and, in the extensively irrigated intensive agricultural areas of Wadi Hadramawt between Shibam and Tarim, usually with a dense cover of trees and bushes. The altitude of its habitats is approximately 250 to 2,500 m.

This species has become closely associated with regularly irrigated agricultural areas (especially cereal cultivation) due to its accessibility to drinking water. Modern irrigation techniques have increased the crops' yield but they also have destroyed some traditional sites through burning and land-use change, and threatening the species that requires dense waterside vegetation for communal roosting.
