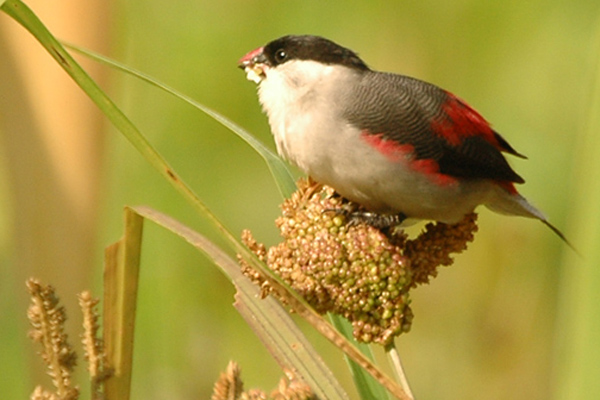

Conservation status
- Least Concern (IUCN 3.1)

Scientific classification
- Kingdom: Animalia
- Phylum: Chordata
- Class: Aves
- Order: Passeriformes
- Family: Estrildidae
- Genus: Estrilda
- Species: E. nonnula

Binomial name
- Estrilda nonnula Hartlaub, 1883

= Black-crowned waxbill =

Species of bird

The black-crowned waxbill (Estrilda nonnula) is a common species of estrildid finch found in western-central Africa. It has an estimated global extent of occurrence of 1,000,000 km^{2}.

== Subspecies ==
- E. n. elizae Alexander, 1903 : Bioko I.
- E. n. eisentrauti Wolters, 1964 : Mt. Cameroon
- E. n. nonnula Hartlaub, 1883 : se Nigeria and Cameroon to se Sudan, w Kenya and nw Tanzania
