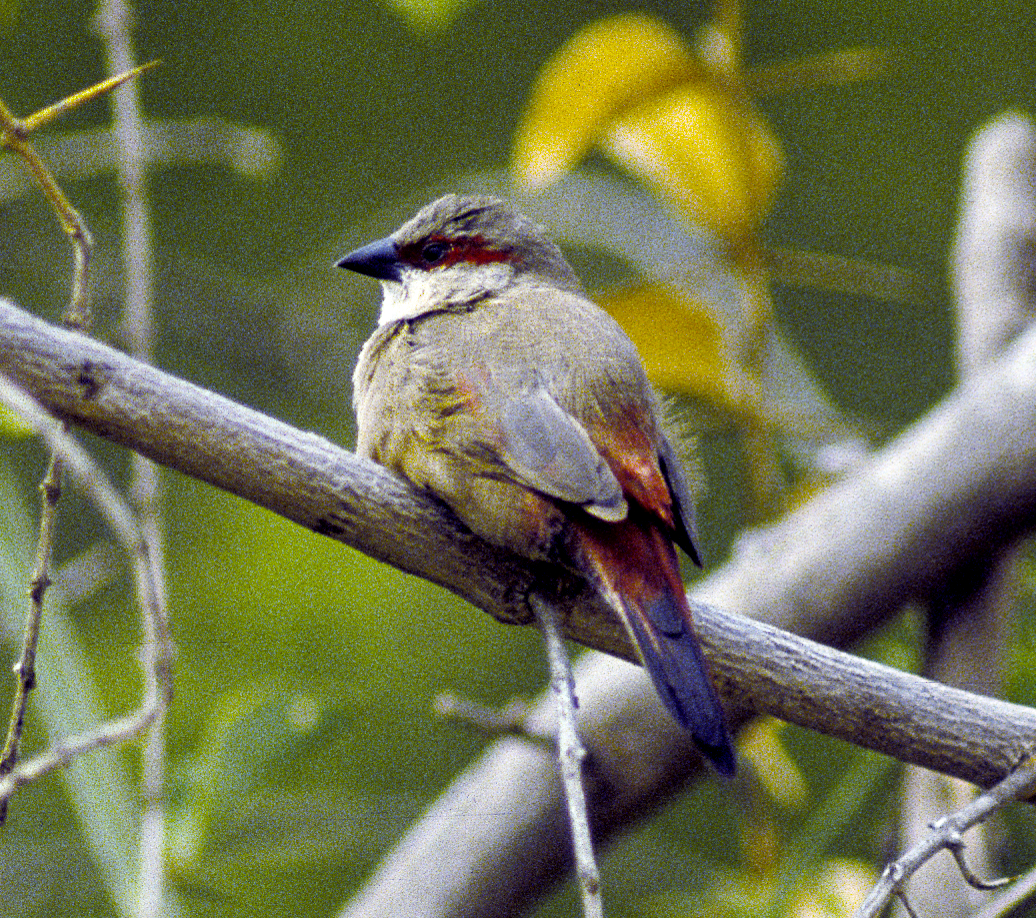
- in Kenya

Conservation status
- Least Concern (IUCN 3.1)

Scientific classification
- Kingdom: Animalia
- Phylum: Chordata
- Class: Aves
- Order: Passeriformes
- Family: Estrildidae
- Genus: Estrilda
- Species: E. rhodopyga

Binomial name
- Estrilda rhodopyga Sundevall, 1850

= Crimson-rumped waxbill =

Species of bird

The crimson-rumped waxbill (Estrilda rhodopyga) also known as rosy-rumped waxbill is a common species of estrildid finch found in eastern Africa. It has an estimated global extent of occurrence of 830,000 km^{2}.

It is found in Burundi, The Democratic Republic of the Congo, Djibouti, Egypt, Eritrea, South Africa, Ethiopia, Kenya, Malawi, Rwanda, Somalia, Sudan, Tanzania and Uganda. The IUCN has classified the species as being of least concern.
