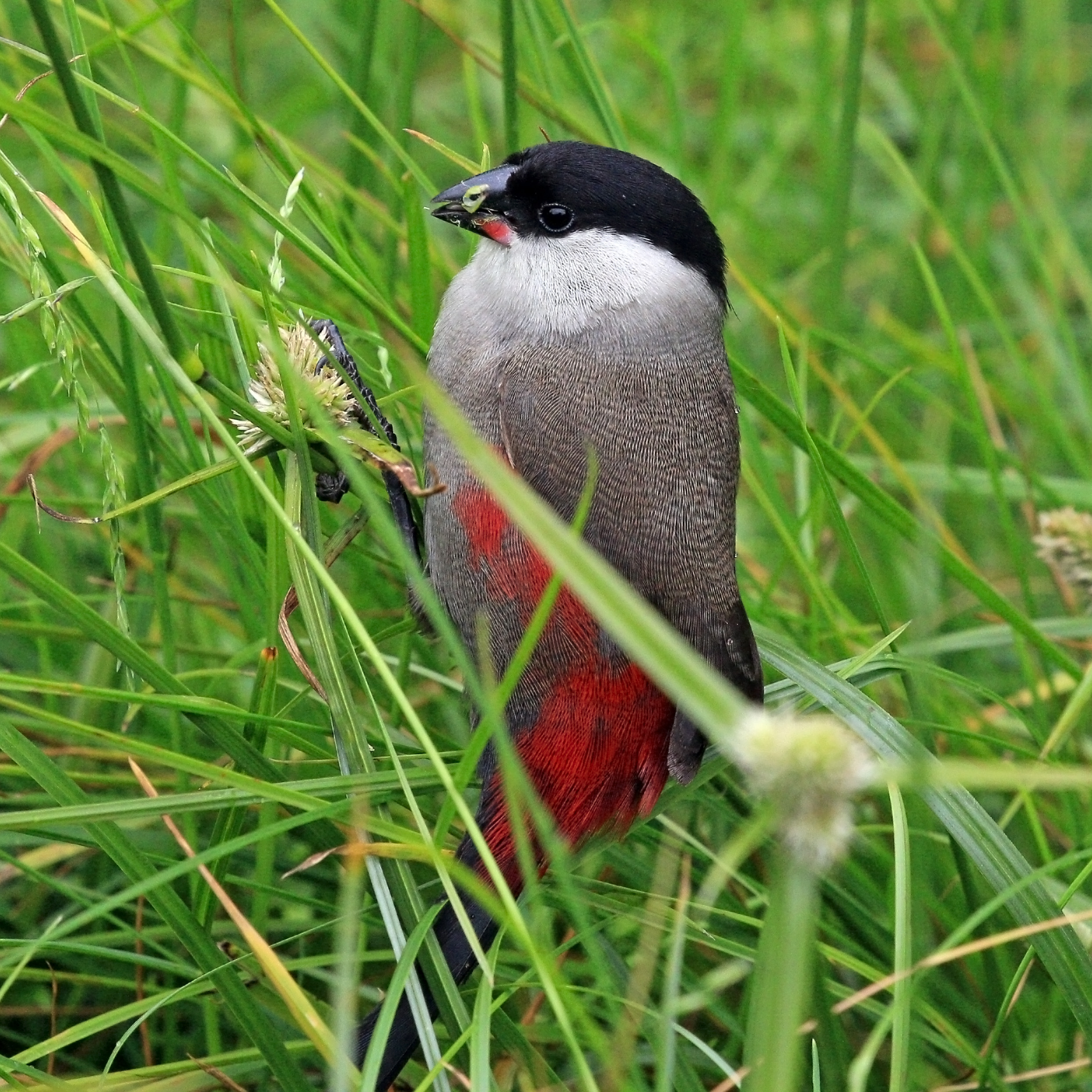
- at Sabyinyo Silverback Lodge; Rwanda

Conservation status
- Least Concern (IUCN 3.1)

Scientific classification
- Kingdom: Animalia
- Phylum: Chordata
- Class: Aves
- Order: Passeriformes
- Family: Estrildidae
- Genus: Estrilda
- Species: E. atricapilla

Binomial name
- Estrilda atricapilla Verreaux & Verreaux, 1851

= Black-headed waxbill =

Species of bird

The black-headed waxbill (Estrilda atricapilla) is a common species of estrildid finch found in central Africa. It has an estimated global extent of occurrence of 620,000 km².

It is found in Angola, Burundi, Cameroon, the Republic of Congo, the Democratic Republic of the Congo, Equatorial Guinea, Gabon, Kenya, Rwanda and Uganda. The IUCN has classified the species as being of least concern.

The eastern subspecies E. a. kandti is sometimes treated as a separate species, Kandt's waxbill.
