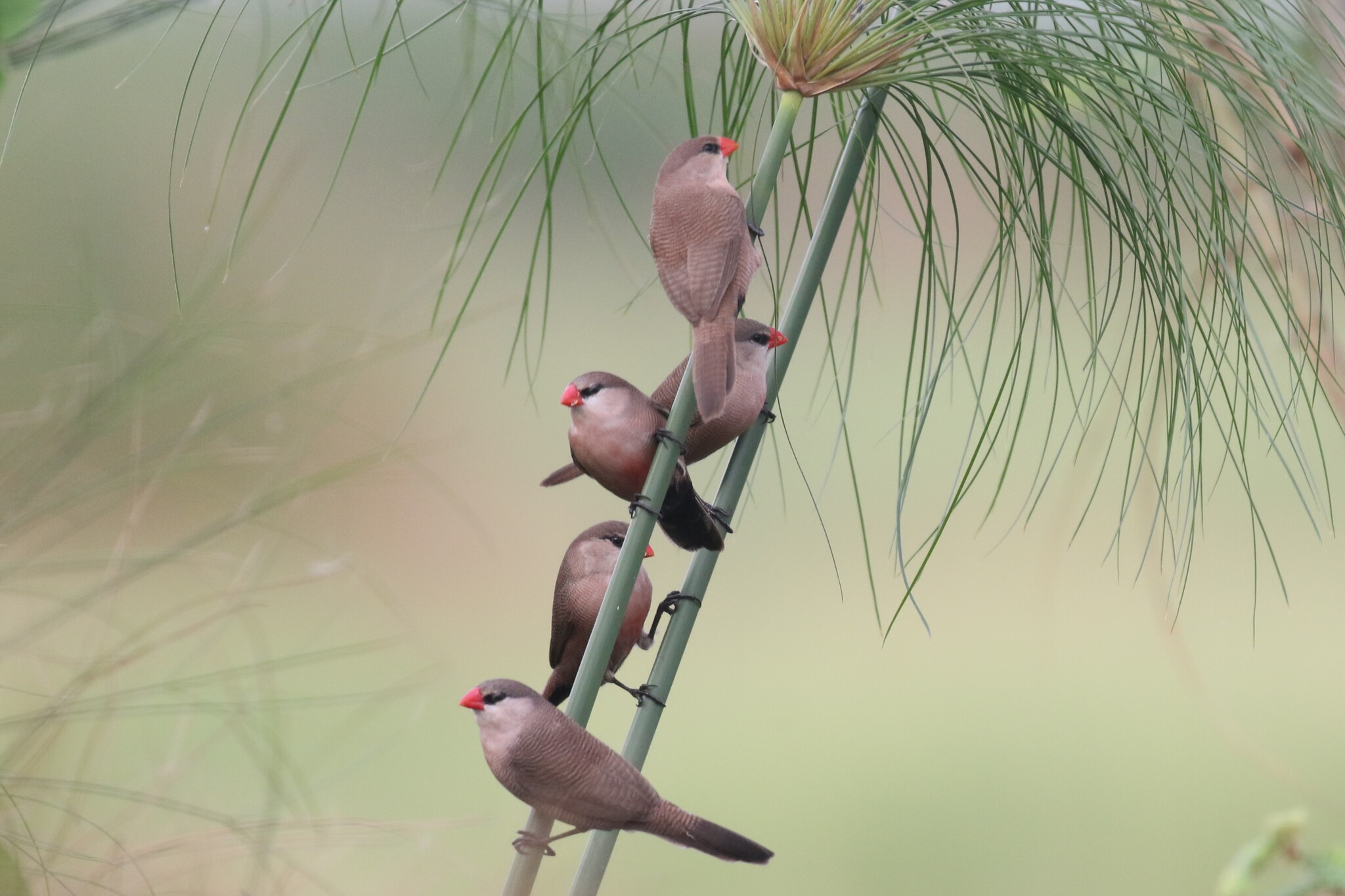

Conservation status
- Data Deficient (IUCN 3.1)

Scientific classification
- Kingdom: Animalia
- Phylum: Chordata
- Class: Aves
- Order: Passeriformes
- Family: Estrildidae
- Genus: Estrilda
- Species: E. nigriloris

Binomial name
- Estrilda nigriloris Chapin, 1928

= Black-lored waxbill =

Species of bird

The black-lored waxbill (Estrilda nigriloris) is a species of estrildid finch found around the Lualaba River and Lake Upemba in the southern part of The Democratic Republic of the Congo. It has an estimated global extent of occurrence of less than 2,600 km^{2}.

In September 2023, the black-lored waxbill was rediscovered in the Democratic Republic of Congo, following a first sighting of the species in 73 years. During an expedition to Upemba National Park, a flock of eight individuals was seen from a boat on Lake Kabwe.

== Habitat ==
It is usually found in grassy plains with tall grasses and bushes, in small flocks. Most of the black-lored waxbill population is probably within the Upemba National Park but it is unclear to what extent its habitat is protected by the authority.
