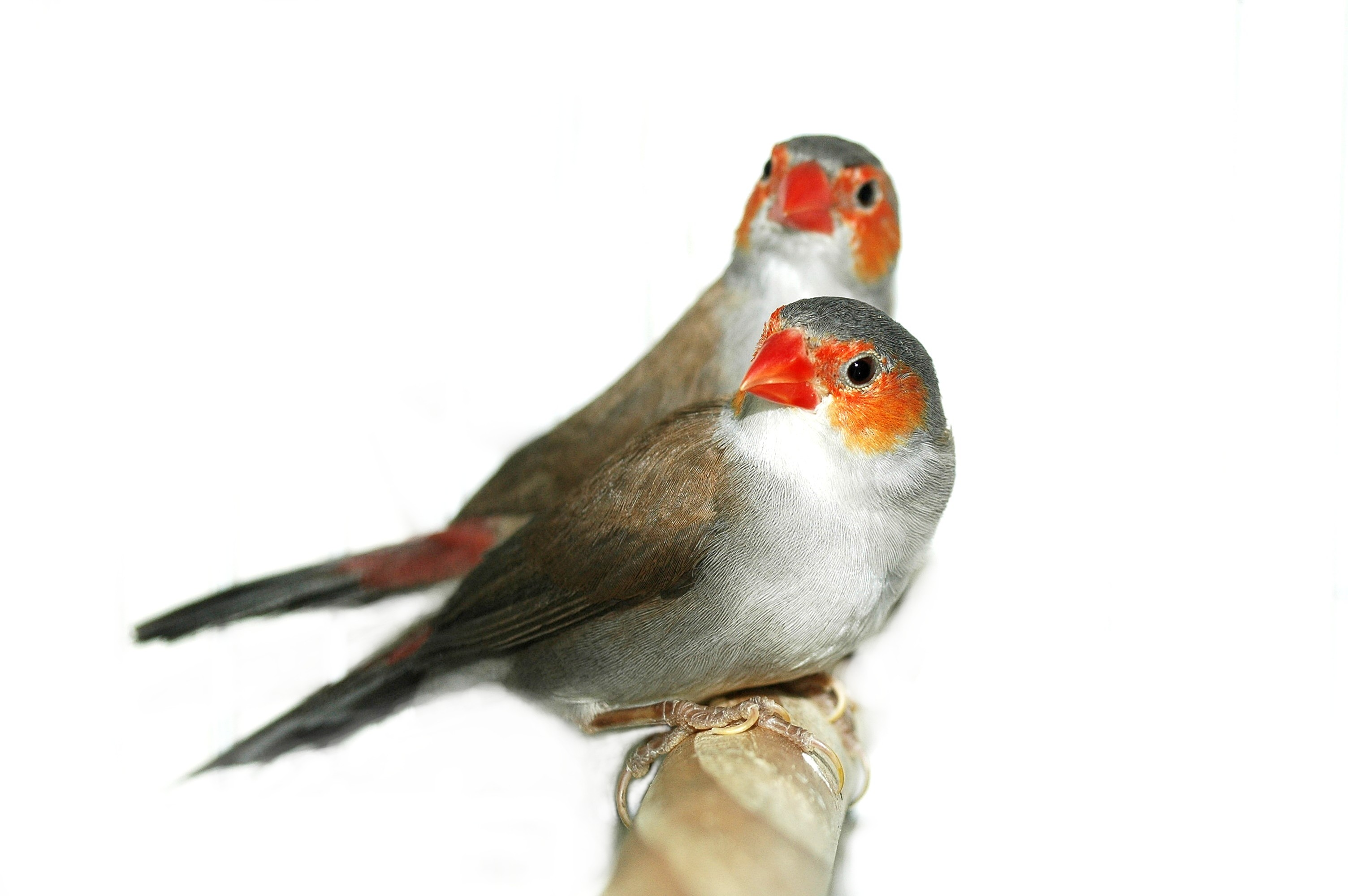

Conservation status
- Least Concern (IUCN 3.1)

Scientific classification
- Kingdom: Animalia
- Phylum: Chordata
- Class: Aves
- Order: Passeriformes
- Family: Estrildidae
- Genus: Estrilda
- Species: E. melpoda

Binomial name
- Estrilda melpoda (Vieillot, 1817)

= Orange-cheeked waxbill =

Species of bird

An orange-cheeked waxbill singing

The orange-cheeked waxbill (Estrilda melpoda) is a common species of estrildid finch native to western and central Africa, with an estimated global extent of occurrence of 3,600,000 km^{2}.

== Behavior ==
The orange-cheeked waxbill lives in small family parties or flocks of thirty of more individuals. Their high-pitched peeps are the best clue of their presence. Like most estridids, they are very acrobatic in their movements on twigs and grass stems, "climbing" up and down verticals and hanging upside down while feeding. Males usually have brighter orange patches on the abdomen.

== Diet ==
They feed on tiny grass seeds, which they collect from the ground or, more often, directly from grass panicles. They hang on the stems and harvest the ripe or green seeds, sometimes while hanging upside down. Small insects such as termites, aphids, and gnats are taken during the breeding season.

== Reproduction ==
This species prefers to nest close to or directly on the ground in tangled clumps of tall grass. They will collect the surrounding grass stems together, especially old seed heads (panicles), helping to camouflage the structure. Fine white feathers line the interior where three to six tiny white eggs will be incubated for 13 days. Fledglings leave the nest after around 23 days looking similar to their parents but sporting duller orange ear coverts for the first few months.

== Origin ==
It is native to the Guineo-Congolian region and more northern Subsaharan areas. They are found in open grassland with light tree and/or shrub coverage, also along watercourses, in gardens and cultivated fields. They are also commonly found in dry savannah habitats. It also can be found at subtropical/ tropical (lowland) wet shrubland habitats. The IUCN has classified the species as being of least concern. It is introduced on Puerto Rico, Saipan, Singapore and Southern California in the United States.

== Captivity ==
=== Habitat ===
Orange cheeks like a lot of grass. They eat the seed heads, forage at roots for tiny insects, and build their nests directly in grass. Some open tall shrubbery and dead, scraggly branches should be provided for roosting. The floor should be composed of a good, dry substrate. Otherwise, the enclosure should have stands of clump and/or runner grasses and reeds which grow 40 cm or taller. Care should be taken to establish walkways through the grass for maintaining the habitat so nests will not be stepped on.

=== Diet ===
Small green and ripe millets form the primary seed diet. They usually harvest these directly from the ripening heads; placing bundles of gathered seeding grasses in the enclosure not only adds to the enjoyment of the keeper but helps provide variety in the diet as well. Any species growing locally is acceptable; be sure to collect from sources free of contaminants such as pesticides. They enjoy spray millet and fresh fruits and vegetables as well.

Additionally, small mealworms, fruit flies, and pinhead crickets (which some will take and others will not) should be offered, especially during breeding. Some pairs will learn to take soft food substitutes, others will not but most will raise young on seed alone, if no other offerings are made. A gentle species, they will be easily bullied at the feeding station if only one is provided and they share their enclosure with more aggressive species.

=== Breeding ===
Orange cheeks will nest in colonies or as single pairs. As noted, they usually prefer a location in a dense clump of grass or other very low vegetative growth. Nests may even be placed directly on the ground, which is why it should be kept as dry as possible. This location also begs invasion by vermin such as mice and rats, so rodent control is imperative. A feather pillow provides a good supply of fine feathers for lining.
