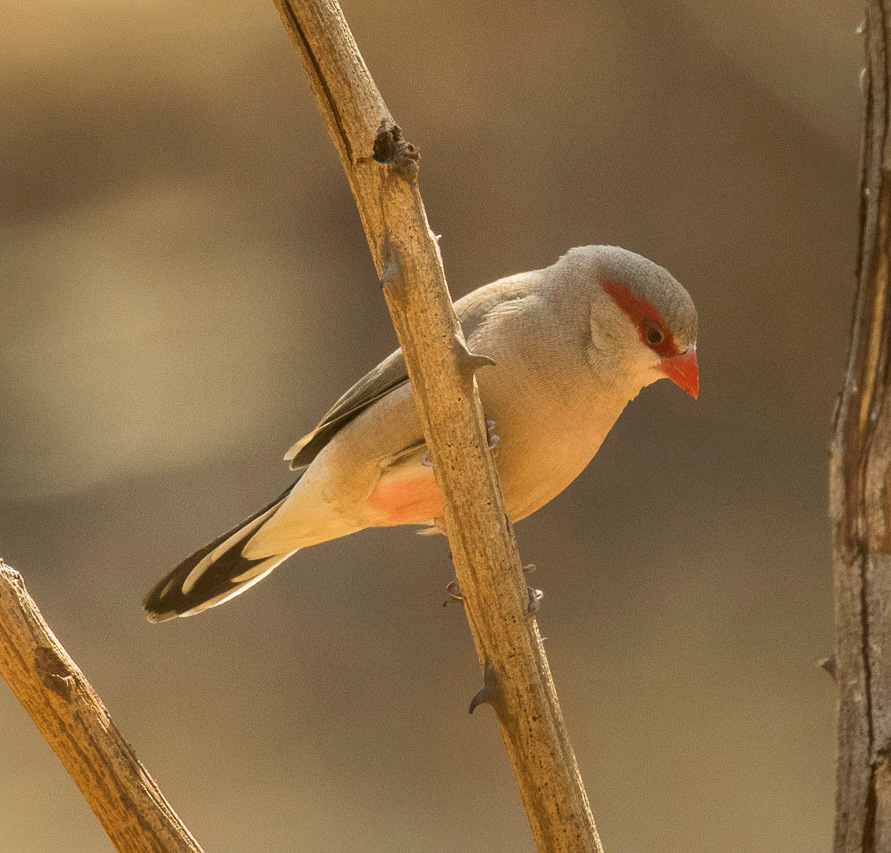

Conservation status
- Least Concern (IUCN 3.1)

Scientific classification
- Kingdom: Animalia
- Phylum: Chordata
- Class: Aves
- Order: Passeriformes
- Family: Estrildidae
- Genus: Estrilda
- Species: E. troglodytes

Binomial name
- Estrilda troglodytes (Lichtenstein, MHC, 1823)

= Black-rumped waxbill =

Species of bird

The black-rumped waxbill (Estrilda troglodytes) is a common species of estrildid finch found in Southern Africa. It has an estimated global extent of occurrence of 2,000,000 km^{2}.

It is found in Benin, Burkina Faso, Cameroon, Central African Republic, Chad, The Democratic Republic of the Congo, Côte d'Ivoire, Eritrea, Ethiopia, Gambia, Ghana, Guinea, Kenya, Liberia, Mali, Mauritania, Niger, Nigeria, Puerto Rico, Senegal, Sudan, Togo, Uganda. The status of the species is evaluated as Least Concern. It is introduced in France (Guadeloupe), Portugal, the United States (Puerto Rico) and Virgin Islands (possibly died out).

== Taxonomy ==
The black-rumped waxbill was first described by Hinrich Lichtenstein in 1823, and at the time was placed in the genus Fringilla. When the genus Estrilda was described in 1850, this species was moved there. It was at one point thought to be conspecific with the Arabian waxbill.

== Non-native ==
Japan: カエデチョウ 【かえでちょう】(kae de chō)

The black-rumped waxbill was introduced into Japan as a pet bird since the 1960s. It has a record of breeding in Tokyo and was also sighted in Osaka and Saitama Prefs. Its impact on the country is unknown, and there is no current regulation.

It has also been introduced in Spain, Hawaii, Puerto Rico, Lesser Antilles, etc.
