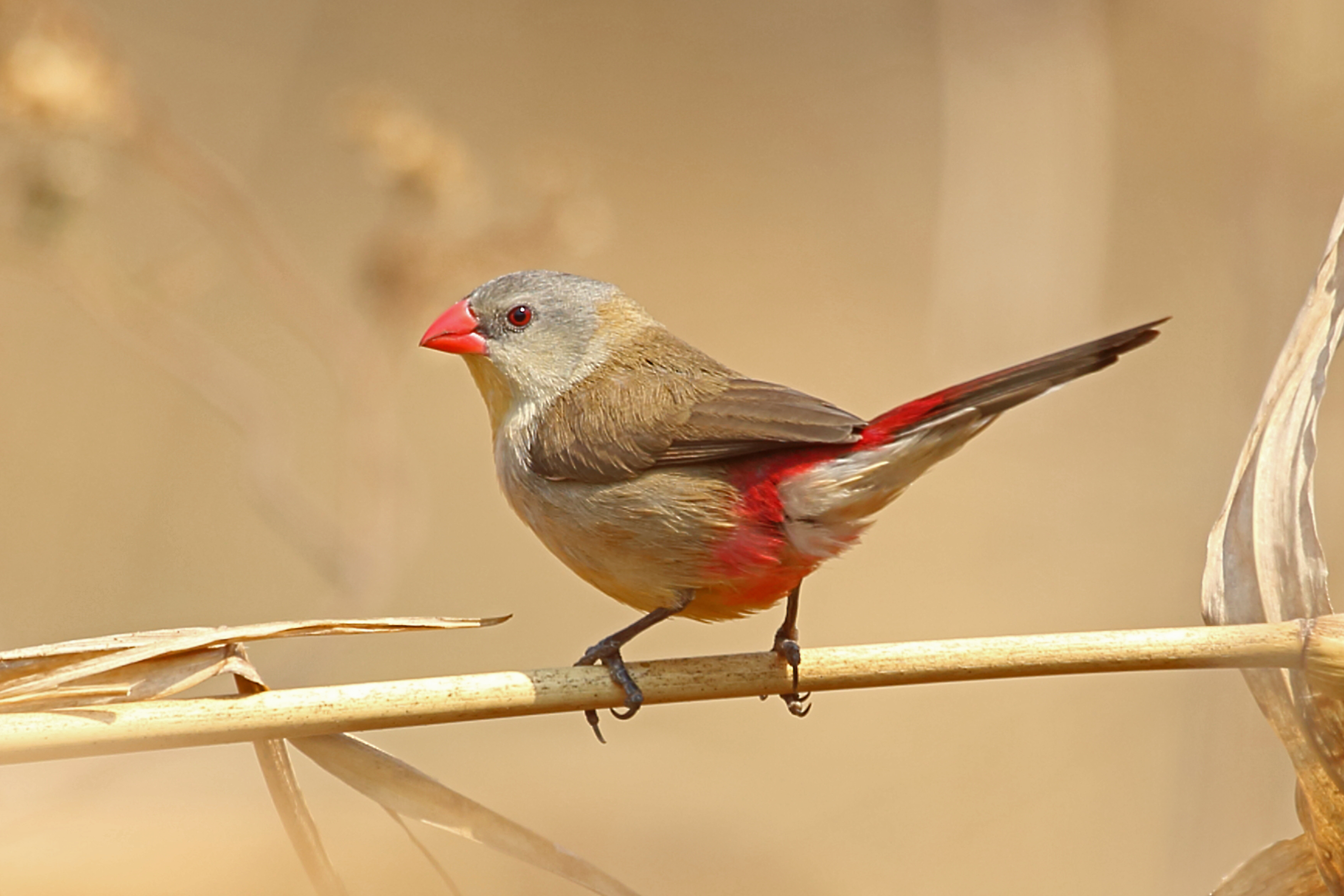

Conservation status
- Least Concern (IUCN 3.1)

Scientific classification
- Kingdom: Animalia
- Phylum: Chordata
- Class: Aves
- Order: Passeriformes
- Family: Estrildidae
- Genus: Estrilda
- Species: E. paludicola

Binomial name
- Estrilda paludicola Heuglin, 1863

= Fawn-breasted waxbill =

Species of bird

The fawn-breasted waxbill (Estrilda paludicola) is a common species of estrildid finch found in central Africa. It has an estimated global extent of occurrence of 1,800,000 km^{2}. Estrilda paludicola, E. ochrogaster and E. poliopareia have been lumped into E. paludicola (Dowsett and Forbes-Watson 1993).

== Taxonomy ==
The fawn-breasted waxbill was formally described in 1863 by the German explorer and ornithologist Theodor von Heuglin from a specimen collected on the middle course of the Bahr el Ghazal River in South Sudan. He placed the species in the genus Estrilda (which he spelled as Estrelda) and coined the binomial name Estrilda paludicola. The specific epithet paludicola is Latin meaning "marsh-dweller" (from palus, paludis meaning "swamp" and -cola meaning "dweller").

Six subspecies are recognised:

- E. p. paludicola Heuglin, 1863 – east Central African Republic and north DR Congo to west Kenya
- E. p. roseicrissa Reichenow, 1892 – east DR Congo and southwest Uganda to northwest Tanzania
- E. p. marwitzi Reichenow, 1900 – central south Tanzania
- E. p. benguellensis Neumann, 1908 – Angola, south DR Congo and Zambia
- E. p. ruthae Chapin, 1950 – central DR Congo
- E. p. ochrogaster Salvadori, 1897 – southeast Sudan and Ethiopia

The subspecies E. p. ochrogaster has sometimes been considered as a separate species, the Abyssinian waxbill.

== Distribution and habitat ==
The fawn-breasted waxbill is commonly found in subtropical/tropical (lowland) wet grassland habitats in Angola, Burundi, Central African Republic, the Democratic Republic of the Congo, Ethiopia, Gabon, Kenya, Republic of the Congo, Rwanda, Sudan, Tanzania, Uganda and Zambia. However, it also inhabits dry forest and dry shrubland habitats. The IUCN has classified the species as being of least concern.
