= List of birds of South Sudan =

This is a list of the bird species recorded in South Sudan. The avifauna of South Sudan include a total of 831 species.

This list's taxonomic treatment (designation and sequence of orders, families and species) and nomenclature (common and scientific names) follow the conventions of The Clements Checklist of Birds of the World, 2022 edition. The family accounts at the beginning of each heading reflect this taxonomy, as do the species counts found in each family account. Introduced and accidental species are included in the total counts for South Sudan.

The following tags have been used to highlight several categories. The commonly occurring native species do not fall into any of these categories.

- (A) Accidental - a species that rarely or accidentally occurs in South Sudan
- (E) Endemic - a species endemic to South Sudan
- (I) Introduced - a species introduced to South Sudan as a consequence, direct or indirect, of human actions

== Ostriches ==
Order: Struthioniformes Family: Struthionidae

- Common ostrich, Struthio camelus

== Ducks, geese, and waterfowl ==
Order: Anseriformes Family: Anatidae

Anatidae includes the ducks and most duck-like waterfowl, such as geese and swans. These birds are adapted to an aquatic existence with webbed feet, flattened bills, and feathers that are excellent at shedding water due to an oily coating.

- White-faced whistling-duck, Dendrocygna viduata
- Fulvous whistling-duck, Dendrocygna bicolor
- White-backed duck, Thalassornis leuconotus (A)
- Knob-billed duck, Sarkidiornis melanotos
- Hartlaub's duck, Pteronetta hartlaubii (A)
- Egyptian goose, Alopochen aegyptiacus
- Ruddy shelduck, Tadorna ferruginea (A)
- Spur-winged goose, Plectropterus gambensis
- African pygmy-goose, Nettapus auritus
- Garganey, Spatula querquedula
- Blue-billed teal, Spatula hottentota
- Northern shoveler, Spatula clypeata
- Eurasian wigeon, Mareca penelope
- African black duck, Anas sparsa
- Mallard, Anas platyrhynchos (A)
- Red-billed duck, Anas erythrorhyncha (A)
- Northern pintail, Anas acuta
- Green-winged teal, Anas crecca
- Southern pochard, Netta erythrophthalma (A)
- Ferruginous duck, Aythya nyroca
- Tufted duck, Aythya fuligula

== Guineafowl ==
Order: Galliformes Family: Numididae

Guineafowl are a group of African, seed-eating, ground-nesting birds that resemble partridges, but with featherless heads and spangled grey plumage.

- Helmeted guineafowl, Numida meleagris
- Western crested guineafowl, Guttera verreauxi

== New World quail ==
Order: Galliformes Family: Odontophoridae

Despite their family's common name, this species and one other are native to Africa.

- Stone partridge, Ptilopachus petrosus

== Pheasants, grouse, and allies ==
Order: Galliformes Family: Phasianidae

The Phasianidae are a family of terrestrial birds which consists of quails, snowcocks, francolins, spurfowls, tragopans, monals, pheasants, peafowls and jungle fowls. In general, they are plump (although they vary in size) and have broad, relatively short wings.

- Latham's francolin, Peliperdix lathami (A)
- Crested francolin, Ortygornis sephaena
- Schlegel's francolin, Campocolinus schlegelii (A)
- Orange River francolin, Scleroptila gutturalis (A)
- Blue quail, Synoicus adansonii
- Common quail, Coturnix coturnix
- Harlequin quail, Coturnix delegorguei
- Scaly francolin, Pternistis squamatus
- Heuglin's francolin, Pternistis icterorhynchus
- Clapperton's francolin, Pternistis clappertoni
- Yellow-necked francolin, Pternistis leucoscepus

== Flamingos ==
Order: Phoenicopteriformes Family: Phoenicopteridae

Flamingos are gregarious wading birds, usually 3 to 5 feet (0.9 to 1.5 m) tall, found in both the Western and Eastern Hemispheres. Flamingos filter-feed on shellfish and algae. Their oddly shaped beaks are specially adapted to separate mud and silt from the food they consume and, uniquely, are used upside-down.

- Greater flamingo, Phoenicopterus roseus

== Grebes ==
Order: Podicipediformes Family: Podicipedidae

Grebes are small to medium-large freshwater diving birds. They have lobed toes and are excellent swimmers and divers. However, they have their feet placed far back on the body, making them quite ungainly on land.

- Little grebe, Tachybaptus ruficollis

== Pigeons and doves ==
Order: Columbiformes Family: Columbidae

Pigeons and doves are stout-bodied birds with short necks and short slender bills with a fleshy cere.

- Rock pigeon, Columba livia (I)
- Speckled pigeon, Columba guinea
- Afep pigeon, Columba unicincta (A)
- Rameron pigeon, Columba arquatrix
- Delegorgue's pigeon, Columba delegorguei
- Bronze-naped pigeon, Columba iriditorques (A)
- Lemon dove, Columba larvata
- White-naped pigeon, Columba albinucha (A)
- European turtle-dove, Streptopelia turtur
- Dusky turtle-dove, Streptopelia lugens
- Mourning collared-dove, Streptopelia decipiens
- Red-eyed dove, Streptopelia semitorquata
- Ring-necked dove, Streptopelia capicola
- Vinaceous dove, Streptopelia vinacea
- Laughing dove, Streptopelia senegalensis
- Emerald-spotted wood-dove, Turtur chalcospilos
- Black-billed wood-dove, Turtur abyssinicus
- Tambourine dove, Turtur tympanistria
- Namaqua dove, Oena capensis
- Bruce's green-pigeon, Treron waalia
- African green-pigeon, Treron calva

== Sandgrouse ==
Order: Pterocliformes Family: Pteroclidae

Sandgrouse have small, pigeon-like heads and necks, but sturdy compact bodies. They have long pointed wings and sometimes tails and a fast direct flight. Flocks fly to watering holes at dawn and dusk. Their legs are feathered down to the toes.

- Chestnut-bellied sandgrouse, Pterocles exustus
- Lichtenstein's sandgrouse, Pterocles lichtensteinii
- Four-banded sandgrouse, Pterocles quadricinctus

== Bustards ==
Order: Otidiformes Family: Otididae

Bustards are large terrestrial birds mainly associated with dry open country and steppes in the Old World. They are omnivorous and nest on the ground. They walk steadily on strong legs and big toes, pecking for food as they go. They have long broad wings with "fingered" wingtips and striking patterns in flight. Many have interesting mating displays.

- Arabian bustard, Ardeotis arabs
- Denham's bustard, Neotis denhami (A)
- White-bellied bustard, Eupodotis senegalensis
- Buff-crested bustard, Eupodotis gindiana
- Black-bellied bustard, Lissotis melanogaster
- Hartlaub's bustard, Lissotis hartlaubii (A)

== Turacos ==
Order: Musophagiformes Family: Musophagidae

The turacos, plantain eaters and go-away-birds make up the bird family Musophagidae. They are medium-sized arboreal birds. The turacos and plantain eaters are brightly coloured, usually in blue, green or purple. The go-away birds are mostly grey and white.

- Great blue turaco, Corythaeola cristata
- Black-billed turaco, Tauraco schuettii (A)
- White-crested turaco, Tauraco leucolophus
- White-cheeked turaco, Tauraco leucotis (A)
- Ross's turaco, Musophaga rossae (A)
- White-bellied go-away-bird, Corythaixoides leucogaster
- Eastern plantain-eater, Crinifer zonurus

== Cuckoos and anis ==
Order: Cuculiformes Family: Cuculidae

The family Cuculidae includes cuckoos, roadrunners and anis. These birds are of variable size with slender bodies, long tails and strong legs. The Old World cuckoos are brood parasites.

- Senegal coucal, Centropus senegalensis (A)
- Blue-headed coucal, Centropus monachus
- White-browed coucal, Centropus superciliosus
- Black coucal, Centropus grillii (A)
- Blue malkoha, Ceuthmochares aereus
- Great spotted cuckoo, Clamator glandarius
- Levaillant's cuckoo, Clamator levaillantii
- Pied cuckoo, Clamator jacobinus
- Thick-billed cuckoo, Pachycoccyx audeberti (A)
- Dideric cuckoo, Chrysococcyx caprius
- Klaas's cuckoo, Chrysococcyx klaas
- Yellow-throated cuckoo, Chrysococcyx flavigularis (A)
- African emerald cuckoo, Chrysococcyx cupreus
- Black cuckoo, Cuculus clamosus
- Red-chested cuckoo, Cuculus solitarius
- African cuckoo, Cuculus gularis (A)
- Common cuckoo, Cuculus canorus

== Nightjars and allies ==
Order: Caprimulgiformes Family: Caprimulgidae

Nightjars are medium-sized nocturnal birds that usually nest on the ground. They have long wings, short legs and very short bills. Most have small feet, of little use for walking, and long pointed wings. Their soft plumage is camouflaged to resemble bark or leaves.

- Pennant-winged nightjar, Caprimulgus vexillarius
- Standard-winged nightjar, Caprimulgus longipennis
- Eurasian nightjar, Caprimulgus europaeus (A)
- Sombre nightjar, Caprimulgus fraenatus (A)
- Egyptian nightjar, Caprimulgus aegyptius
- Donaldson-Smith's nightjar, Caprimulgus donaldsoni
- Fiery-necked nightjar, Caprimulgus pectoralis
- Montane nightjar, Caprimulgus poliocephalus
- Swamp nightjar, Caprimulgus natalensis (A)
- Plain nightjar, Caprimulgus inornatus
- Star-spotted nightjar, Caprimulgus stellatus (A)
- Freckled nightjar, Caprimulgus tristigma (A)
- Long-tailed nightjar, Caprimulgus climacurus
- Slender-tailed nightjar, Caprimulgus clarus

== Swifts ==
Order: Caprimulgiformes Family: Apodidae

Swifts are small birds which spend the majority of their lives flying. These birds have very short legs and never settle voluntarily on the ground, perching instead only on vertical surfaces. Many swifts have long swept-back wings which resemble a crescent or boomerang.

- Scarce swift, Schoutedenapus myoptilus (A)
- Alpine swift, Apus melba
- Mottled swift, Apus aequatorialis
- Common swift, Apus apus
- Pallid swift, Apus pallidus (A)
- Little swift, Apus affinis
- White-rumped swift, Apus caffer
- African palm-swift, Cypsiurus parvus

== Flufftails ==
Order: Gruiformes Family: Sarothruridae

The flufftails are a small family of ground-dwelling birds found only in Madagascar and sub-Saharan Africa.

- White-spotted flufftail, Sarothrura pulchra (A)
- Buff-spotted flufftail, Sarothrura elegans
- Striped flufftail, Sarothrura affinis (A)

== Rails, gallinules, and coots ==
Order: Gruiformes Family: Rallidae

Rallidae is a large family of small to medium-sized birds which includes the rails, crakes, coots and gallinules. Typically they inhabit dense vegetation in damp environments near lakes, swamps or rivers. In general they are shy and secretive birds, making them difficult to observe. Most species have strong legs and long toes which are well adapted to soft uneven surfaces. They tend to have short, rounded wings and to be weak fliers.

- African rail, Rallus caerulescens (A)
- Corn crake, Crex crex (A)
- African crake, Crex egregia (A)
- Spotted crake, Porzana porzana
- Lesser moorhen, Paragallinula angulata (A)
- Allen's gallinule, Porphyrio alleni
- African swamphen, Porphyrio madagascariensis (A)
- Black crake, Zapornia flavirostris
- Little crake, Zapornia parva

== Cranes ==
Order: Gruiformes Family: Gruidae

Cranes are large, long-legged and long-necked birds. Unlike the similar-looking but unrelated herons, cranes fly with necks outstretched, not pulled back. Most have elaborate and noisy courting displays or "dances".

- Gray crowned-crane, Balearica regulorum (A)
- Black crowned-crane, Balearica pavonina
- Demoiselle crane, Anthropoides virgo
- Common crane, Grus grus

== Thick-knees ==
Order: Charadriiformes Family: Burhinidae

The thick-knees are a group of largely tropical waders in the family Burhinidae. They are found worldwide within the tropical zone, with some species also breeding in temperate Europe and Australia. They are medium to large waders with strong black or yellow-black bills, large yellow eyes and cryptic plumage. Despite being classed as waders, most species have a preference for arid or semi-arid habitats.

- Senegal thick-knee, Burhinus senegalensis
- Spotted thick-knee, Burhinus capensis

== Egyptian plover ==
Order: Charadriiformes Family: Pluvianidae

The Egyptian plover is found across equatorial Africa and along the Nile River.

- Egyptian plover, Pluvianus aegyptius

== Stilts and avocets ==
Order: Charadriiformes Family: Recurvirostridae

Recurvirostridae is a family of large wading birds, which includes the avocets and stilts. The avocets have long legs and long up-curved bills. The stilts have extremely long legs and long, thin, straight bills.

- Black-winged stilt, Himantopus himantopus
- Pied avocet, Recurvirostra avosetta

== Plovers and lapwings ==
Order: Charadriiformes Family: Charadriidae

The family Charadriidae includes the plovers, dotterels and lapwings. They are small to medium-sized birds with compact bodies, short, thick necks and long, usually pointed, wings. They are found in open country worldwide, mostly in habitats near water.

- Black-bellied plover, Pluvialis squatarola
- Long-toed lapwing, Vanellus crassirostris (A)
- Spur-winged lapwing, Vanellus spinosus
- Black-headed lapwing, Vanellus tectus
- White-headed lapwing, Vanellus albiceps (A)
- Crowned lapwing, Vanellus coronatus
- Wattled lapwing, Vanellus senegallus
- White-tailed lapwing, Vanellus leucurus
- Lesser sand-plover, Charadrius mongolus
- Caspian plover, Charadrius asiaticus
- Kittlitz's plover, Charadrius pecuarius
- Kentish plover, Charadrius alexandrinus (A)
- Common ringed plover, Charadrius hiaticula
- Little ringed plover, Charadrius dubius
- Three-banded plover, Charadrius tricollaris
- Forbes's plover, Charadrius forbesi

== Painted-snipes ==
Order: Charadriiformes Family: Rostratulidae

Painted-snipes are short-legged, long-billed birds similar in shape to the true snipes, but more brightly coloured.

- Greater painted-snipe, Rostratula benghalensis (A)

== Jacanas ==
Order: Charadriiformes Family: Jacanidae

The jacanas are a group of tropical waders in the family Jacanidae. They are found throughout the tropics. They are identifiable by their huge feet and claws which enable them to walk on floating vegetation in the shallow lakes that are their preferred habitat.

- Lesser jacana, Microparra capensis (A)
- African jacana, Actophilornis africanus

== Sandpipers and allies ==
Order: Charadriiformes Family: Scolopacidae

Scolopacidae is a large diverse family of small to medium-sized shorebirds including the sandpipers, curlews, godwits, shanks, tattlers, woodcocks, snipes, dowitchers and phalaropes. The majority of these species eat small invertebrates picked out of the mud or soil. Variation in length of legs and bills enables multiple species to feed in the same habitat, particularly on the coast, without direct competition for food.

- Eurasian curlew, Numenius arquata
- Black-tailed godwit, Limosa limosa
- Ruddy turnstone, Arenaria interpres
- Ruff, Calidris pugnax
- Broad-billed sandpiper, Calidris falcinellus (A)
- Curlew sandpiper, Calidris ferruginea
- Temminck's stint, Calidris temminckii
- Sanderling, Calidris alba (A)
- Dunlin, Calidris alpina
- Little stint, Calidris minuta
- Jack snipe, Lymnocryptes minimus
- Great snipe, Gallinago media (A)
- Common snipe, Gallinago gallinago
- African snipe, Gallinago nigripennis
- Terek sandpiper, Xenus cinereus
- Common sandpiper, Actitis hypoleucos
- Green sandpiper, Tringa ochropus
- Spotted redshank, Tringa erythropus
- Common greenshank, Tringa nebularia
- Marsh sandpiper, Tringa stagnatilis
- Wood sandpiper, Tringa glareola
- Common redshank, Tringa totanus

== Buttonquail ==
Order: Charadriiformes Family: Turnicidae

The buttonquail are small, drab, running birds which resemble the true quails. The female is the brighter of the sexes and initiates courtship. The male incubates the eggs and tends the young.

- Small buttonquail, Turnix sylvatica
- Quail-plover, Ortyxelos meiffrenii (A)

== Pratincoles and coursers ==
Order: Charadriiformes Family: Glareolidae

Glareolidae is a family of wading birds comprising the pratincoles, which have short legs, long pointed wings and long forked tails, and the coursers, which have long legs, short wings and long, pointed bills which curve downwards.

- Cream-colored courser, Cursorius cursor
- Somali courser, Cursorius somalensis
- Temminck's courser, Cursorius temminckii (A)
- Three-banded courser, Rhinoptilus cinctus (A)
- Bronze-winged courser, Rhinoptilus chalcopterus (A)
- Collared pratincole, Glareola pratincola
- Black-winged pratincole, Glareola nordmanni
- Rock pratincole, Glareola nuchalis (A)

== Gulls, terns, and skimmers ==
Order: Charadriiformes Family: Laridae

Laridae is a family of medium to large seabirds, the gulls, terns, and skimmers. They are typically grey or white, often with black markings on the head or wings. They have stout, longish bills and webbed feet. Terns are a group of generally medium to large seabirds typically with grey or white plumage, often with black markings on the head. Most terns hunt fish by diving but some pick insects off the surface of fresh water. Terns are generally long-lived birds, with several species known to live in excess of 30 years. Skimmers are a small family of tropical tern-like birds. They have an elongated lower mandible which they use to feed by flying low over the water surface and skimming the water for small fish.

- Gray-hooded gull, Chroicocephalus cirrocephalus (A)
- Black-headed gull, Chroicocephalus ridibundus
- Lesser black-backed gull, Larus fuscus (A)
- Gull-billed tern, Gelochelidon nilotica
- Caspian tern, Hydroprogne caspia
- White-winged tern, Chlidonias leucopterus
- Whiskered tern, Chlidonias hybrida
- African skimmer, Rynchops flavirostris

== Storks ==
Order: Ciconiiformes Family: Ciconiidae

Storks are large, long-legged, long-necked, wading birds with long, stout bills. Storks are mute, but bill-clattering is an important mode of communication at the nest. Their nests can be large and may be reused for many years. Many species are migratory.

- African openbill, Anastomus lamelligerus
- Black stork, Ciconia nigra
- Abdim's stork, Ciconia abdimii
- African woolly-necked stork, Ciconia microscelis
- White stork, Ciconia ciconia
- Saddle-billed stork, Ephippiorhynchus senegalensis
- Marabou stork, Leptoptilos crumenifer
- Yellow-billed stork, Mycteria ibis

== Anhingas ==
Order: Suliformes Family: Anhingidae

Anhingas or darters are often called "snake-birds" because of their long thin neck, which gives a snake-like appearance when they swim with their bodies submerged. The males have black and dark-brown plumage, an erectile crest on the nape and a larger bill than the female. The females have much paler plumage especially on the neck and underparts. The darters have completely webbed feet and their legs are short and set far back on the body. Their plumage is somewhat permeable, like that of cormorants, and they spread their wings to dry after diving.

- African darter, Anhinga melanogaster

== Cormorants and shags ==
Order: Suliformes Family: Phalacrocoracidae

Phalacrocoracidae is a family of medium to large coastal, fish-eating seabirds that includes cormorants and shags. Plumage colouration varies, with the majority having mainly dark plumage, some species being black-and-white and a few being colourful.

- Long-tailed cormorant, Microcarbo africanus
- Great cormorant, Phalacrocorax carbo (A)

== Pelicans ==
Order: Pelecaniformes Family: Pelecanidae

Pelicans are large water birds with a distinctive pouch under their beak. As with other members of the order Pelecaniformes, they have webbed feet with four toes.

- Great white pelican, Pelecanus onocrotalus
- Pink-backed pelican, Pelecanus rufescens

== Shoebill ==
Order: Pelecaniformes Family: Balaenicipididae

The shoebill is a large bird related to the storks. It derives its name from its massive shoe-shaped bill.

- Shoebill, Balaeniceps rex

== Hammerkop ==
Order: Pelecaniformes Family: Scopidae

The hammerkop is a medium-sized bird with a long shaggy crest. The shape of its head with a curved bill and crest at the back is reminiscent of a hammer, hence its name. Its plumage is drab-brown all over.

- Hamerkop, Scopus umbretta

== Herons, egrets, and bitterns ==
Order: Pelecaniformes Family: Ardeidae

The family Ardeidae contains the bitterns, herons and egrets. Herons and egrets are medium to large wading birds with long necks and legs. Bitterns tend to be shorter necked and more wary. Members of Ardeidae fly with their necks retracted, unlike other long-necked birds such as storks, ibises and spoonbills.

- Little bittern, Ixobrychus minutus
- Dwarf bittern, Ixobrychus sturmii
- Gray heron, Ardea cinerea
- Black-headed heron, Ardea melanocephala
- Goliath heron, Ardea goliath
- Purple heron, Ardea purpurea
- Great egret, Ardea alba
- Intermediate egret, Ardea intermedia
- Little egret, Egretta garzetta
- Black heron, Egretta ardesiaca
- Cattle egret, Bubulcus ibis
- Squacco heron, Ardeola ralloides
- Striated heron, Butorides striata
- Black-crowned night-heron, Nycticorax nycticorax
- White-backed night-heron, Gorsachius leuconotus

== Ibises and spoonbills ==
Order: Pelecaniformes Family: Threskiornithidae

Threskiornithidae is a family of large terrestrial and wading birds which includes the ibises and spoonbills. They have long, broad wings with 11 primary and about 20 secondary feathers. They are strong fliers and despite their size and weight, very capable soarers.

- Glossy ibis, Plegadis falcinellus
- African sacred ibis, Threskiornis aethiopicus
- Hadada ibis, Bostrychia hagedash
- Eurasian spoonbill, Platalea leucorodia (A)
- African spoonbill, Platalea alba

== Secretarybird ==
Order: Accipitriformes Family: Sagittariidae

The secretarybird is a bird of prey in the order Accipitriformes but is easily distinguished from other raptors by its long crane-like legs.

- Secretarybird, Sagittarius serpentarius

== Osprey ==
Order: Accipitriformes Family: Pandionidae

The family Pandionidae contains only one species, the osprey. The osprey is a medium-large raptor which is a specialist fish-eater with a worldwide distribution.

- Osprey, Pandion haliaetus

== Hawks, eagles, and kites ==
Order: Accipitriformes Family: Accipitridae

Accipitridae is a family of birds of prey, which includes hawks, eagles, kites, harriers and Old World vultures. These birds have powerful hooked beaks for tearing flesh from their prey, strong legs, powerful talons and keen eyesight.

- Black-winged kite, Elanus caeruleus
- Scissor-tailed kite, Chelictinia riocourii
- African harrier-hawk, Polyboroides typus
- Palm-nut vulture, Gypohierax angolensis
- Egyptian vulture, Neophron percnopterus
- European honey-buzzard, Pernis apivorus
- African cuckoo-hawk, Aviceda cuculoides (A)
- White-headed vulture, Trigonoceps occipitalis
- Lappet-faced vulture, Torgos tracheliotos
- Hooded vulture, Necrosyrtes monachus
- White-backed vulture, Gyps africanus
- Rüppell's griffon, Gyps rueppelli
- Bateleur, Terathopius ecaudatus
- Short-toed snake-eagle, Circaetus gallicus
- Beaudouin's snake-eagle, Circaetus beaudouini
- Black-chested snake-eagle, Circaetus pectoralis
- Brown snake-eagle, Circaetus cinereus
- Banded snake-eagle, Circaetus cinerascens
- Bat hawk, Macheiramphus alcinus (A)
- Crowned eagle, Stephanoaetus coronatus (A)
- Martial eagle, Polemaetus bellicosus (A)
- Long-crested eagle, Lophaetus occipitalis
- Lesser spotted eagle, Clanga pomarina
- Wahlberg's eagle, Hieraaetus wahlbergi
- Booted eagle, Hieraaetus pennatus
- Ayres's hawk-eagle, Hieraaetus ayresii (A)
- Tawny eagle, Aquila rapax
- Steppe eagle, Aquila nipalensis
- Verreaux's eagle, Aquila verreauxii
- African hawk-eagle, Aquila spilogaster (A)
- Lizard buzzard, Kaupifalco monogrammicus (A)
- Dark chanting-goshawk, Melierax metabates
- Eastern chanting-goshawk, Melierax poliopterus (A)
- Gabar goshawk, Micronisus gabar
- Grasshopper buzzard, Butastur rufipennis
- Eurasian marsh-harrier, Circus aeruginosus
- African marsh-harrier, Circus ranivorus (A)
- Pallid harrier, Circus macrourus
- Montagu's harrier, Circus pygargus
- African goshawk, Accipiter tachiro (A)
- Shikra, Accipiter badius
- Levant sparrowhawk, Accipiter brevipes
- Little sparrowhawk, Accipiter minullus (A)
- Eurasian sparrowhawk, Accipiter nisus
- Rufous-breasted sparrowhawk, Accipiter rufiventris (A)
- Black goshawk, Accipiter melanoleucus
- Long-tailed hawk, Urotriorchis macrourus (A)
- Black kite, Milvus migrans
- African fish-eagle, Haliaeetus vocifer
- Common buzzard, Buteo buteo
- Mountain buzzard, Buteo oreophilus (A)
- Long-legged buzzard, Buteo rufinus
- Red-necked buzzard, Buteo auguralis
- Augur buzzard, Buteo augur

== Barn-owls ==
Order: Strigiformes Family: Tytonidae

Barn-owls are medium to large owls with large heads and characteristic heart-shaped faces. They have long strong legs with powerful talons.

- Barn owl, Tyto alba

== Owls ==
Order: Strigiformes Family: Strigidae

The typical owls are small to large solitary nocturnal birds of prey. They have large forward-facing eyes and ears, a hawk-like beak and a conspicuous circle of feathers around each eye called a facial disk.

- Eurasian scops-owl, Otus scops
- African scops-owl, Otus senegalensis
- Northern white-faced owl, Ptilopsis leucotis
- Grayish eagle-owl, Bubo cinerascens
- Verreaux's eagle-owl, Bubo lacteus
- Pel's fishing-owl, Scotopelia peli
- Pearl-spotted owlet, Glaucidium perlatum
- African wood-owl, Strix woodfordii
- Marsh owl, Asio capensis

== Mousebirds ==
Order: Coliiformes Family: Coliidae

The mousebirds are slender greyish or brown birds with soft, hairlike body feathers and very long thin tails. They are arboreal and scurry through the leaves like rodents in search of berries, fruit and buds. They are acrobatic and can feed upside down. All species have strong claws and reversible outer toes. They also have crests and stubby bills.

- Speckled mousebird, Colius striatus
- Blue-naped mousebird, Urocolius macrourus

== Trogons ==
Order: Trogoniformes Family: Trogonidae

The family Trogonidae includes trogons and quetzals. Found in tropical woodlands worldwide, they feed on insects and fruit, and their broad bills and weak legs reflect their diet and arboreal habits. Although their flight is fast, they are reluctant to fly any distance. Trogons have soft, often colourful, feathers with distinctive male and female plumage.

- Narina trogon, Apaloderma narina

== Hoopoes ==
Order: Bucerotiformes Family: Upupidae

Hoopoes have black, white and orangey-pink colouring with a large erectile crest on their head.

- Eurasian hoopoe, Upupa epops

== Woodhoopoes and scimitarbills ==
Order: Bucerotiformes Family: Phoeniculidae

The woodhoopoes are related to the kingfishers, rollers and hoopoes. They most resemble the hoopoes with their long curved bills, used to probe for insects, and short rounded wings. However, they differ in that they have metallic plumage, often blue, green or purple, and lack an erectile crest.

- Green woodhoopoe, Phoeniculus purpureus
- White-headed woodhoopoe, Phoeniculus bollei
- Black scimitarbill, Rhinopomastus aterrimus
- Abyssinian scimitarbill, Rhinopomastus minor

== Ground-hornbills ==
Order: Bucerotiformes Family: Bucorvidae

The ground-hornbills are terrestrial birds which feed almost entirely on insects, other birds, snakes, and amphibians.

- Abyssinian ground-hornbill, Bucorvus abyssinicus

== Hornbills ==
Order: Bucerotiformes Family: Bucerotidae

Hornbills are a group of birds whose bill is shaped like a cow's horn, but without a twist, sometimes with a casque on the upper mandible. Frequently, the bill is brightly coloured.

- Red-billed dwarf hornbill, Lophoceros camurus (A)
- Crowned hornbill, Lophoceros alboterminatus
- African pied hornbill, Lophoceros fasciatus
- Hemprich's hornbill, Lophoceros hemprichii
- African gray hornbill, Lophoceros nasutus
- Eastern yellow-billed hornbill, Tockus flavirostris
- Jackson's hornbill, Tockus jacksoni
- Northern red-billed hornbill, Tockus erythrorhynchus
- Black dwarf hornbill, Horizocerus hartlaubi
- Black-casqued hornbill, Ceratogymna atrata (A)
- Silvery-cheeked hornbill, Bycanistes brevis (A)
- Black-and-white-casqued hornbill, Bycanistes subcylindricus
- Piping hornbill, Bycanistes fistulator (A)

== Kingfishers ==
Order: Coraciiformes Family: Alcedinidae

Kingfishers are medium-sized birds with large heads, long, pointed bills, short legs and stubby tails.

- Half-collared kingfisher, Alcedo semitorquata (A)
- Shining-blue kingfisher, Alcedo quadribrachys (A)
- Malachite kingfisher, Corythornis cristatus
- African pygmy kingfisher, Ispidina picta
- African dwarf kingfisher, Ispidina lecontei
- Chocolate-backed kingfisher, Halcyon badia
- Gray-headed kingfisher, Halcyon leucocephala
- Woodland kingfisher, Halcyon senegalensis
- Blue-breasted kingfisher, Halcyon malimbica
- Striped kingfisher, Halcyon chelicuti
- Giant kingfisher, Megaceryle maximus
- Pied kingfisher, Ceryle rudis

== Bee-eaters ==
Order: Coraciiformes Family: Meropidae

The bee-eaters are a group of near passerine birds in the family Meropidae. Most species are found in Africa but others occur in southern Europe, Madagascar, Australia and New Guinea. They are characterised by richly coloured plumage, slender bodies and usually elongated central tail feathers. All are colourful and have long downturned bills and pointed wings, which give them a swallow-like appearance when seen from afar.

- Red-throated bee-eater, Merops bulocki
- Little bee-eater, Merops pusillus
- Ethiopian bee-eater, Merops lafresnayii
- Cinnamon-chested bee-eater, Merops oreobates
- Swallow-tailed bee-eater, Merops hirundineus
- Black-headed bee-eater, Merops breweri
- White-throated bee-eater, Merops albicollis
- African green bee-eater, Merops viridissimus
- Blue-cheeked bee-eater, Merops persicus
- Madagascar bee-eater, Merops superciliosus
- European bee-eater, Merops apiaster
- Northern carmine bee-eater, Merops nubicus

== Rollers ==
Order: Coraciiformes Family: Coraciidae

Rollers resemble crows in size and build, but are more closely related to the kingfishers and bee-eaters. They share the colourful appearance of those groups with blues and browns predominating. The two inner front toes are connected, but the outer toe is not.

- European roller, Coracias garrulus
- Abyssinian roller, Coracias abyssinica
- Rufous-crowned roller, Coracias naevia
- Blue-bellied roller, Coracias cyanogaster (A)
- Broad-billed roller, Eurystomus glaucurus

== African barbets ==
Order: Piciformes Family: Lybiidae

The African barbets are plump birds, with short necks and large heads. They get their name from the bristles which fringe their heavy bills. Most species are brightly coloured.

- Yellow-billed barbet, Trachyphonus purpuratus
- Red-and-yellow barbet, Trachyphonus erythrocephalus
- D'Arnaud's barbet, Trachyphonus darnaudii
- Gray-throated barbet, Gymnobucco bonapartei
- Yellow-rumped tinkerbird, Pogoniulus bilineatus
- Red-fronted tinkerbird, Pogoniulus pusillus
- Yellow-fronted tinkerbird, Pogoniulus chrysoconus
- Hairy-breasted barbet, Tricholaema hirsuta
- Red-fronted barbet, Tricholaema diademata
- Spot-flanked barbet, Tricholaema lachrymosa
- Black-throated barbet, Tricholaema melanocephala
- Vieillot's barbet, Lybius vieilloti
- White-headed barbet, Lybius leucocephalus
- Black-billed barbet, Lybius guifsobalito
- Double-toothed barbet, Lybius bidentatus
- Black-breasted barbet, Lybius rolleti

== Honeyguides ==
Order: Piciformes Family: Indicatoridae

Honeyguides are among the few birds that feed on wax. They are named for the greater honeyguide which leads traditional honey-hunters to bees' nests and, after the hunters have harvested the honey, feeds on the remaining contents of the hive.

- Cassin's honeyguide, Prodotiscus insignis
- Least honeyguide, Indicator exilis
- Lesser honeyguide, Indicator minor
- Spotted honeyguide, Indicator maculatus (A)
- Scaly-throated honeyguide, Indicator variegatus
- Greater honeyguide, Indicator indicator

== Woodpeckers ==
Order: Piciformes Family: Picidae

Woodpeckers are small to medium-sized birds with chisel-like beaks, short legs, stiff tails and long tongues used for capturing insects. Some species have feet with two toes pointing forward and two backward, while several species have only three toes. Many woodpeckers have the habit of tapping noisily on tree trunks with their beaks.

- Eurasian wryneck, Jynx torquilla
- Rufous-necked wryneck, Jynx ruficollis (A)
- Speckle-breasted woodpecker, Chloropicus poecilolaemus (A)
- Cardinal woodpecker, Chloropicus fuscescens
- Bearded woodpecker, Chloropicus namaquus
- Golden-crowned woodpecker, Chloropicus xantholophus (A)
- Brown-backed woodpecker, Chloropicus obsoletus
- African gray woodpecker, Chloropicus goertae
- Brown-eared woodpecker, Campethera caroli
- Buff-spotted woodpecker, Campethera nivosa (A)
- Green-backed woodpecker, Campethera cailliautii (A)
- Nubian woodpecker, Campethera nubica
- Fine-spotted woodpecker, Campethera punctuligera
- Golden-tailed woodpecker, Campethera abingoni

== Falcons and caracaras ==
Order: Falconiformes Family: Falconidae

Falconidae is a family of diurnal birds of prey. They differ from hawks, eagles and kites in that they kill with their beaks instead of their talons.

- Pygmy falcon, Polihierax semitorquatus
- Eurasian kestrel, Falco tinnunculus
- Fox kestrel, Falco alopex
- Gray kestrel, Falco ardosiaceus
- Red-necked falcon, Falco chicquera
- Eleonora's falcon, Falco eleonorae
- Eurasian hobby, Falco subbuteo
- African hobby, Falco cuvierii (A)
- Lanner falcon, Falco biarmicus
- Saker falcon, Falco cherrug
- Peregrine falcon, Falco peregrinus
- Taita falcon, Falco fasciinucha (A)

== Old World parrots ==
Order: Psittaciformes Family: Psittaculidae

Characteristic features of parrots include a strong curved bill, an upright stance, strong legs, and clawed zygodactyl feet. Many parrots are vividly colored, and some are multi-colored. In size they range from 8 cm (3.1 in) to 1 m (3.3 ft) in length. Old World parrots are found from Africa east across south and southeast Asia and Oceania to Australia and New Zealand.

- Rose-ringed parakeet, Psittacula krameri
- Red-headed lovebird, Agapornis pullarius

== African and New World parrots ==
Order: Psittaciformes Family: Psittacidae

Characteristic features of parrots include a strong curved bill, an upright stance, strong legs, and clawed zygodactyl feet. Many parrots are vividly colored, and some are multi-colored. In size they range from 8 cm (3.1 in) to 1 m (3.3 ft) in length. Most of the more than 150 species in this family are found in the New World.

- Meyer's parrot, Poicephalus meyeri
- Niam-Niam parrot, Poicephalus crassus (A)

== Cuckooshrikes ==
Order: Passeriformes Family: Campephagidae

The cuckooshrikes are small to medium-sized passerine birds. They are predominantly greyish with white and black, although some species are brightly coloured.

- Gray cuckooshrike, Coracina caesia
- White-breasted cuckooshrike, Coracina pectoralis
- Black cuckooshrike, Campephaga flava
- Red-shouldered cuckooshrike, Campephaga phoenicea
- Purple-throated cuckooshrike, Campephaga quiscalina

== Old World orioles ==
Order: Passeriformes Family: Oriolidae

The Old World orioles are colourful passerine birds. They are not related to the New World orioles.

- Eurasian golden oriole, Oriolus oriolus
- African golden oriole, Oriolus auratus
- Western black-headed oriole, Oriolus brachyrynchus (A)
- African black-headed oriole, Oriolus larvatus
- Black-winged oriole, Oriolus nigripennis

== Wattle-eyes and batises ==
Order: Passeriformes Family: Platysteiridae

The wattle-eyes, or puffback flycatchers, are small stout passerine birds of the African tropics. They get their name from the brightly coloured fleshy eye decorations found in most species in this group.

- Brown-throated wattle-eye, Platysteira cyanea
- Chestnut wattle-eye, Platysteira castanea
- Jameson's wattle-eye, Platysteira jamesoni
- Chinspot batis, Batis molitor
- Gray-headed batis, Batis orientalis
- Western black-headed batis, Batis erlangeri
- Pygmy batis, Batis perkeo

== Vangas, helmetshrikes, and allies ==
Order: Passeriformes Family: Vangidae

The helmetshrikes are similar in build to the shrikes, but tend to be colourful species with distinctive crests or other head ornaments, such as wattles, from which they get their name.

- White helmetshrike, Prionops plumatus
- African shrike-flycatcher, Megabyas flammulatus
- Black-and-white shrike-flycatcher, Bias musicus

== Bushshrikes and allies ==
Order: Passeriformes Family: Malaconotidae

Bushshrikes are similar in habits to shrikes, hunting insects and other small prey from a perch on a bush. Although similar in build to the shrikes, these tend to be either colourful species or largely black; some species are quite secretive.

- Brubru, Nilaus afer
- Northern puffback, Dryoscopus gambensis
- Pink-footed puffback, Dryoscopus angolensis (A)
- Marsh tchagra, Tchagra minuta
- Black-crowned tchagra, Tchagra senegala
- Brown-crowned tchagra, Tchagra australis
- Three-streaked tchagra, Tchagra jamesi
- Lühder's bushshrike, Laniarius luehderi (A)
- Ethiopian boubou, Laniarius aethiopicus
- Tropical boubou, Laniarius major
- Black-headed gonolek, Laniarius erythrogaster
- Slate-colored boubou, Laniarius funebris
- Lowland sooty boubou, Laniarius leucorhynchus (A)
- Rosy-patched bushshrike, Rhodophoneus cruentus
- Sulphur-breasted bushshrike, Telophorus sulfureopectus
- Gray-headed bushshrike, Malaconotus blanchoti

== Drongos ==
Order: Passeriformes Family: Dicruridae

The drongos are mostly black or dark grey in colour, sometimes with metallic tints. They have long forked tails, and some Asian species have elaborate tail decorations. They have short legs and sit very upright when perched, like a shrike. They flycatch or take prey from the ground.

- Sharpe's drongo, Dicrurus sharpei
- Glossy-backed drongo, Dicrurus divaricatus
- Velvet-mantled drongo, Dicrurus modestus

== Monarch flycatchers ==
Order: Passeriformes Family: Monarchidae

The monarch flycatchers are small to medium-sized insectivorous passerines which hunt by flycatching.

- Blue-headed crested-flycatcher, Trochocercus nitens (A)
- African paradise-flycatcher, Terpsiphone viridis

== Shrikes ==
Order: Passeriformes Family: Laniidae

Shrikes are passerine birds known for their habit of catching other birds and small animals and impaling the uneaten portions of their bodies on thorns. A typical shrike's beak is hooked, like a bird of prey.

- Red-backed shrike, Lanius collurio
- Red-tailed shrike, Lanius phoenicuroides
- Isabelline shrike, Lanius isabellinus
- Emin's shrike, Lanius gubernator
- Great gray shrike, Lanius excubitor
- Lesser gray shrike, Lanius minor (A)
- Gray-backed fiscal, Lanius excubitoroides
- Yellow-billed shrike, Lanius corvinus
- Taita fiscal, Lanius dorsalis
- Somali fiscal, Lanius somalicus (A)
- Northern fiscal, Lanius humeralis
- Masked shrike, Lanius nubicus
- Woodchat shrike, Lanius senator
- White-rumped shrike, Eurocephalus ruppelli

== Crows, jays, and magpies ==
Order: Passeriformes Family: Corvidae

The family Corvidae includes crows, ravens, jays, choughs, magpies, treepies, nutcrackers and ground jays. Corvids are above average in size among the Passeriformes, and some of the larger species show high levels of intelligence.

- Piapiac, Ptilostomus afer
- Cape crow, Corvus capensis
- Pied crow, Corvus albus
- Somali crow, Corvus edithae
- Fan-tailed raven, Corvus rhipidurus
- White-necked raven, Corvus albicollis (A)

== Hyliotas ==
Order: Passeriformes Family: Hyliotidae

The members of this small family, all of genus Hyliota, are birds of the forest canopy. They tend to feed in mixed-species flocks.

- Yellow-bellied hyliota, Hyliota flavigaster

== Fairy flycatchers ==
Order: Passeriformes Family: Stenostiridae

Most of the species of this small family are found in Africa, though a few inhabit tropical Asia. They are not closely related to other birds called "flycatchers".

- African blue flycatcher, Elminia longicauda
- Dusky crested-flycatcher, Elminia nigromitrata (A)

== Tits, chickadees, and titmice ==
Order: Passeriformes Family: Paridae

The Paridae are mainly small stocky woodland species with short stout bills. Some have crests. They are adaptable birds, with a mixed diet including seeds and insects.

- White-shouldered black-tit, Melaniparus guineensis
- White-bellied tit, Melaniparus albiventris
- Dusky tit, Melaniparus funereus (A)

== Penduline-tits ==
Order: Passeriformes Family: Remizidae

The penduline-tits are a group of small passerine birds related to the true tits. They are insectivores.

- Sennar penduline-tit, Anthoscopus punctifrons
- Mouse-coloured penduline-tit, Anthoscopus musculus
- Yellow penduline-tit, Anthoscopus parvulus

== Larks ==
Order: Passeriformes Family: Alaudidae

Larks are small terrestrial birds with often extravagant songs and display flights. Most larks are fairly dull in appearance. Their food is insects and seeds. There are 14 species which have been recorded in South Sudan.

- Rufous-rumped lark, Pinarocorys erythropygia
- Chestnut-backed sparrow-lark, Eremopterix leucotis
- Black-crowned sparrow-lark, Eremopterix nigriceps
- Chestnut-headed sparrow-lark, Eremopterix signatus
- Pink-breasted Lark, Calendulauda poecilosterna
- Red-winged lark, Mirafra hypermetra
- Flappet lark, Mirafra rufocinnamomea
- Kordofan lark, Mirafra cordofanica (A)
- White-tailed lark, Mirafra albicauda
- Horsfield's bushlark, Mirafra javanica
- Greater short-toed lark, Calandrella brachydactyla
- Sun lark, Galerida modesta

== Nicators ==
Order: Passeriformes Family: Nicatoridae

The nicators are shrike-like, with hooked bills. They are endemic to sub-Saharan Africa.

- Western nicator, Nicator chloris

== African warblers ==
Order: Passeriformes Family: Macrosphenidae

African warblers are small to medium-sized insectivores which are found in a wide variety of habitats south of the Sahara.

- Green crombec, Sylvietta virens
- Northern crombec, Sylvietta brachyura
- Red-faced crombec, Sylvietta whytii
- Moustached grass-warbler, Melocichla mentalis
- Yellow longbill, Macrosphenus flavicans
- Green hylia, Hylia prasina

== Cisticolas and allies ==
Order: Passeriformes Family: Cisticolidae

The Cisticolidae are warblers found mainly in warmer southern regions of the Old World. They are generally very small birds of drab brown or grey appearance found in open country such as grassland or scrub.

- Yellow-bellied eremomela, Eremomela icteropygialis
- Green-backed eremomela, Eremomela canescens
- Rufous-crowned eremomela, Eremomela badiceps (A)
- Red-winged gray warbler, Drymocichla incana
- White-chinned prinia, Schistolais leucopogon
- Black-collared apalis, Oreolais pulchra
- Gray wren-warbler, Calamonastes simplex
- Green-backed camaroptera, Camaroptera brachyura
- Yellow-browed camaroptera, Camaroptera superciliaris (A)
- Olive-green camaroptera, Camaroptera chloronota (A)
- Buff-bellied warbler, Phyllolais pulchella
- Black-throated apalis, Apalis jacksoni
- Yellow-breasted apalis, Apalis flavida
- Buff-throated apalis, Apalis rufogularis
- Gray apalis, Apalis cinerea
- Tawny-flanked prinia, Prinia subflava
- Pale prinia, Prinia somalica
- Red-winged prinia, Prinia erythroptera (A)
- Red-fronted prinia, Prinia rufifrons
- Black-faced rufous-warbler, Bathmocercus rufus
- Gray-capped warbler, Eminia lepida (A)
- Red-faced cisticola, Cisticola erythrops
- Singing cisticola, Cisticola cantans
- Whistling cisticola, Cisticola lateralis
- Rock-loving cisticola, Cisticola aberrans
- Boran cisticola, Cisticola bodessa
- Rattling cisticola, Cisticola chiniana
- Ashy cisticola, Cisticola cinereolus (A)
- Red-pate cisticola, Cisticola ruficeps
- Winding cisticola, Cisticola marginatus
- Stout cisticola, Cisticola robustus (A)
- Croaking cisticola, Cisticola natalensis
- Siffling cisticola, Cisticola brachypterus
- Foxy cisticola, Cisticola troglodytes
- Tiny cisticola, Cisticola nana (A)
- Zitting cisticola, Cisticola juncidis
- Desert cisticola, Cisticola aridulus
- Black-backed cisticola, Cisticola eximius
- Wing-snapping cisticola, Cisticola ayresii

== Reed warblers and allies ==
Order: Passeriformes Family: Acrocephalidae

The members of this family are usually rather large for "warblers". Most are rather plain olivaceous brown above with much yellow to beige below. They are usually found in open woodland, reedbeds, or tall grass. The family occurs mostly in southern to western Eurasia and surroundings, but it also ranges far into the Pacific, with some species in Africa.

- Eastern olivaceous warbler, Iduna pallida
- African yellow-warbler, Iduna natalensis
- Mountain yellow-warbler, Iduna similis
- Upcher's warbler, Hippolais languida (A)
- Icterine warbler, Hippolais icterina (A)
- Sedge warbler, Acrocephalus schoenobaenus
- Common reed warbler, Acrocephalus scirpaceus
- Basra reed warbler, Acrocephalus griseldis
- Lesser swamp warbler, Acrocephalus gracilirostris
- Greater swamp warbler, Acrocephalus rufescens
- Great reed warbler, Acrocephalus arundinaceus

== Grassbirds and allies ==
Order: Passeriformes Family: Locustellidae

Locustellidae are a family of small insectivorous songbirds found mainly in Eurasia, Africa, and the Australian region. They are smallish birds with tails that are usually long and pointed, and tend to be drab brownish or buffy all over.

- Bamboo warbler, Locustella alfredi
- Savi's warbler, Locustella luscinioides
- Fan-tailed grassbird, Catriscus brevirostris
- Cinnamon bracken-warbler, Bradypterus cinnamomeus
- Highland rush warbler, Bradypterus centralis

== Swallows ==
Order: Passeriformes Family: Hirundinidae

The family Hirundinidae is adapted to aerial feeding. They have a slender streamlined body, long pointed wings and a short bill with a wide gape. The feet are adapted to perching rather than walking, and the front toes are partially joined at the base.

- Plain martin, Riparia paludicola
- Bank swallow, Riparia riparia
- Banded martin, Neophedina cincta
- Rock martin, Ptyonoprogne fuligula
- Barn swallow, Hirundo rustica
- Ethiopian swallow, Hirundo aethiopica
- Wire-tailed swallow, Hirundo smithii
- Red-rumped swallow, Cecropis daurica
- Lesser striped swallow, Cecropis abyssinica
- Rufous-chested swallow, Cecropis semirufa
- Mosque swallow, Cecropis senegalensis
- Common house-martin, Delichon urbicum
- White-headed sawwing, Psalidoprocne albiceps
- Black sawwing, Psalidoprocne pristoptera
- Gray-rumped swallow, Pseudhirundo griseopyga

== Bulbuls ==
Order: Passeriformes Family: Pycnonotidae

Bulbuls are medium-sized songbirds. Some are colourful with yellow, red or orange vents, cheeks, throats or supercilia, but most are drab, with uniform olive-brown to black plumage. Some species have distinct crests.

- Slender-billed greenbul, Stelgidillas gracilirostris
- Red-tailed bristlebill, Bleda syndactylus
- Lesser bristlebill, Bleda notatus
- Simple greenbul, Chlorocichla simplex (A)
- Joyful greenbul, Chlorocichla laetissima
- Honeyguide greenbul, Baeopogon indicator
- Yellow-throated greenbul, Atimastillas flavicollis
- Red-tailed greenbul, Criniger calurus
- Plain greenbul, Eurillas curvirostris
- Yellow-whiskered greenbul, Eurillas latirostris
- Little greenbul, Eurillas virens
- Leaf-love, Phyllastrephus scandens
- Northern brownbul, Phyllastrephus strepitans
- Toro olive-greenbul, Phyllastrephus hypochloris
- Cabanis's greenbul, Phyllastrephus cabanisi
- White-throated greenbul, Phyllastrephus albigularis
- Common bulbul, Pycnonotus barbatus

== Leaf warblers ==
Order: Passeriformes Family: Phylloscopidae

Leaf warblers are a family of small insectivorous birds found mostly in Eurasia and ranging into Wallacea and Africa. The species are of various sizes, often green-plumaged above and yellow below, or more subdued with grayish-green to grayish-brown colors.

- Wood warbler, Phylloscopus sibilatrix
- Eastern Bonelli's warbler, Phylloscopus orientalis
- Willow warbler, Phylloscopus trochilus
- Common chiffchaff, Phylloscopus collybita
- Brown woodland-warbler, Phylloscopus umbrovirens

== Sylviid warblers, parrotbills, and allies ==
Order: Passeriformes Family: Sylviidae

The family Sylviidae is a group of small insectivorous passerine birds. They mainly occur as breeding species, as the common name implies, in Europe, Asia and, to a lesser extent, Africa. Most are of generally undistinguished appearance, but many have distinctive songs.

- Eurasian blackcap, Sylvia atricapilla
- Garden warbler, Sylvia borin
- African hill babbler, Sylvia abyssinica
- Barred warbler, Curruca nisoria
- Lesser whitethroat, Curruca curruca
- Brown parisoma, Curruca lugens
- Eastern Orphean warbler, Curruca crassirostris
- Greater whitethroat, Curruca communis

== White-eyes, yuhinas, and allies ==
Order: Passeriformes Family: Zosteropidae

The white-eyes are small and mostly undistinguished, their plumage above being generally some dull colour like greenish-olive, but some species have a white or bright yellow throat, breast or lower parts, and several have buff flanks. As their name suggests, many species have a white ring around each eye.

- Abyssinian white-eye, Zosterops abyssinicus
- Northern yellow white-eye, Zosterops senegalensis

== Ground babblers ==
Order: Passeriformes Family: Pellorneidae

These small to medium-sized songbirds have soft fluffy plumage but are otherwise rather diverse. Members of the genus Illadopsis are found in forests, but some other genera are birds of scrublands.

- Brown illadopsis, Illadopsis fulvescens
- Scaly-breasted illadopsis, Illadopsis albipectus
- Thrush babbler, Illadopsis turdina (A)
- Puvel's illadopsis, Illadopsis puveli

== Laughingthrushes and allies ==
Order: Passeriformes Family: Leiothrichidae

The members of this family are diverse in size and coloration, though those of genus Turdoides tend to be brown or grayish. The family is found in Africa, India, and southeast Asia.

- Rufous chatterer, Argya rubiginosa
- Brown babbler, Turdoides plebejus
- White-rumped babbler, Turdoides leucopygia
- Dusky babbler, Turdoides tenebrosa

== Treecreepers ==
Order: Passeriformes Family: Certhiidae

Treecreepers are small woodland birds, brown above and white below. They have thin pointed down-curved bills, which they use to extricate insects from bark. They have stiff tail feathers, like woodpeckers, which they use to support themselves on vertical trees.

- African spotted creeper, Salpornis salvadori

== Oxpeckers ==
Order: Passeriformes Family: Buphagidae

As both the English and scientific names of these birds imply, they feed on ectoparasites, primarily ticks, found on large mammals.

- Red-billed oxpecker, Buphagus erythrorhynchus
- Yellow-billed oxpecker, Buphagus africanus

== Starlings ==
Order: Passeriformes Family: Sturnidae

Starlings are small to medium-sized passerine birds. Their flight is strong and direct and they are very gregarious. Their preferred habitat is fairly open country. They eat insects and fruit. Plumage is typically dark with a metallic sheen.

- Wattled starling, Creatophora cinerea
- Violet-backed starling, Cinnyricinclus leucogaster
- Red-winged starling, Onychognathus morio (A)
- Waller's starling, Onychognathus walleri
- Magpie starling, Speculipastor bicolor (A)
- Sharpe's starling, Speculipastor sharpii
- Stuhlmann's starling, Poeoptera stuhlmanni (A)
- Shelley's starling, Lamprotornis shelleyi
- Rüppell's starling, Lamprotornis purpuropterus
- Long-tailed glossy starling, Lamprotornis caudatus
- Splendid starling, Lamprotornis splendidus
- Superb starling, Lamprotornis superbus
- Chestnut-bellied starling, Lamprotornis pulcher (A)
- Lesser blue-eared starling, Lamprotornis chloropterus
- Greater blue-eared starling, Lamprotornis chalybaeus
- Purple starling, Lamprotornis purpureus
- Bronze-tailed starling, Lamprotornis chalcurus

== Thrushes and allies ==
Order: Passeriformes Family: Turdidae

The thrushes are a group of passerine birds that occur mainly in the Old World. They are plump, soft plumaged, small to medium-sized insectivores or sometimes omnivores, often feeding on the ground. Many have attractive songs.

- Rufous flycatcher-thrush, Neocossyphus fraseri
- Spotted ground-thrush, Geokichla guttata (A)
- Abyssinian ground-thrush, Geokichla piaggiae
- Abyssinian thrush, Turdus abyssinicus
- African thrush, Turdus pelios

== Old World flycatchers ==
Order: Passeriformes Family: Muscicapidae

Old World flycatchers are a large group of small passerine birds native to the Old World. They are mainly small arboreal insectivores. The appearance of these birds is highly varied, but they mostly have weak songs and harsh calls.

- African dusky flycatcher, Muscicapa adusta
- Spotted flycatcher, Muscicapa striata
- Gambaga flycatcher, Muscicapa gambagae
- Swamp flycatcher, Muscicapa aquatica
- Sooty flycatcher, Bradornis fuliginosus
- Dusky-blue flycatcher, Bradornis comitatus
- African gray flycatcher, Bradornis microrhynchus
- Pale flycatcher, Agricola pallidus
- Gray tit-flycatcher, Fraseria plumbea
- Ashy flycatcher, Fraseria caerulescens
- Silverbird, Melaenornis semipartitus
- Northern black-flycatcher, Melaenornis edolioides
- White-eyed slaty-flycatcher, Melaenornis fischeri
- Fire-crested alethe, Alethe castanea
- Black scrub-robin, Cercotrichas podobe
- Rufous-tailed scrub-robin, Cercotrichas galactotes
- Red-backed scrub-robin, Cercotrichas leucophrys
- Cape robin-chat, Cossypha caffra
- Blue-shouldered robin-chat, Cossypha cyanocampter
- Gray-winged robin-chat, Cossypha polioptera
- Rüppell's robin-chat, Cossypha semirufa
- White-browed robin-chat, Cossypha heuglini
- Red-capped robin-chat, Cossypha natalensis
- Snowy-crowned robin-chat, Cossypha niveicapilla
- White-crowned robin-chat, Cossypha albicapilla (A)
- Spotted morning-thrush, Cichladusa guttata
- White-starred robin, Pogonocichla stellata
- Brown-chested alethe, Chamaetylas poliocephala (A)
- Yellow-breasted forest robin, Stiphrornis mabirae (A)
- Equatorial akalat, Sheppardia aequatorialis (A)
- Thrush nightingale, Luscinia luscinia
- Common nightingale, Luscinia megarhynchos
- Bluethroat, Luscinia svecica
- Semicollared flycatcher, Ficedula semitorquata
- Common redstart, Phoenicurus phoenicurus
- Little rock-thrush, Monticola rufocinereus
- Rufous-tailed rock-thrush, Monticola saxatilis
- Blue rock-thrush, Monticola solitarius (A)
- Whinchat, Saxicola rubetra
- Siberian stonechat, Saxicola maurus
- African stonechat, Saxicola torquatus
- Mocking cliff-chat, Thamnolaea cinnamomeiventris
- Sooty chat, Myrmecocichla nigra
- Northern wheatear, Oenanthe oenanthe
- Isabelline wheatear, Oenanthe isabellina
- Heuglin's wheatear, Oenanthe heuglini
- Desert wheatear, Oenanthe deserti
- Eastern black-eared wheatear, Oenanthe melanoleuca
- Pied wheatear, Oenanthe pleschanka
- White-fronted black-chat, Oenanthe albifrons
- Familiar chat, Oenanthe familiaris
- Brown-tailed chat, Oenanthe scotocerca

== Sunbirds and spiderhunters ==
Order: Passeriformes Family: Nectariniidae

The sunbirds and spiderhunters are very small passerine birds which feed largely on nectar, although they will also take insects, especially when feeding young. Flight is fast and direct on their short wings. Most species can take nectar by hovering like a hummingbird, but usually perch to feed.

- Western violet-backed sunbird, Anthreptes longuemarei
- Eastern violet-backed sunbird, Anthreptes orientalis
- Little green sunbird, Anthreptes seimundi (A)
- Green sunbird, Anthreptes rectirostris (A)
- Collared sunbird, Hedydipna collaris
- Pygmy sunbird, Hedydipna platura
- Green-headed sunbird, Cyanomitra verticalis
- Olive sunbird, Cyanomitra olivacea
- Green-throated sunbird, Chalcomitra rubescens
- Amethyst sunbird, Chalcomitra amethystina (A)
- Scarlet-chested sunbird, Chalcomitra senegalensis
- Hunter's sunbird, Chalcomitra hunteri (A)
- Tacazze sunbird, Nectarinia tacazze
- Malachite sunbird, Nectarinia famosa (A)
- Olive-bellied sunbird, Cinnyris chloropygius (A)
- Northern double-collared sunbird, Cinnyris reichenowi
- Beautiful sunbird, Cinnyris pulchellus
- Mariqua sunbird, Cinnyris mariquensis (A)
- Red-chested sunbird, Cinnyris erythrocerca
- Palestine sunbird, Cinnyris oseus
- Shining sunbird, Cinnyris habessinicus (A)
- Splendid sunbird, Cinnyris coccinigaster
- Variable sunbird, Cinnyris venustus
- Copper sunbird, Cinnyris cupreus

== Weavers and allies ==
Order: Passeriformes Family: Ploceidae

The weavers are small passerine birds related to the finches. They are seed-eating birds with rounded conical bills. The males of many species are brightly coloured, usually in red or yellow and black, some species show variation in colour only in the breeding season.

- White-billed buffalo-weaver, Bubalornis albirostris
- Red-billed buffalo-weaver, Bubalornis niger
- White-headed buffalo-weaver, Dinemellia dinemelli
- Speckle-fronted weaver, Sporopipes frontalis
- White-browed sparrow-weaver, Plocepasser mahali
- Chestnut-crowned sparrow-weaver, Plocepasser superciliosus
- Gray-headed social-weaver, Pseudonigrita arnaudi (A)
- Red-bellied malimbe, Malimbus erythrogaster (A)
- Blue-billed malimbe, Malimbus nitens (A)
- Red-headed malimbe, Malimbus rubricollis (A)
- Red-headed weaver, Anaplectes rubriceps
- Baglafecht weaver, Ploceus baglafecht
- Little weaver, Ploceus luteolus
- Black-necked weaver, Ploceus nigricollis
- Spectacled weaver, Ploceus ocularis
- Black-billed weaver, Ploceus melanogaster
- Northern masked-weaver, Ploceus taeniopterus
- Lesser masked-weaver, Ploceus intermedius
- Vitelline masked-weaver, Ploceus vitellinus
- Heuglin's masked-weaver, Ploceus heuglini
- Rüppell's weaver, Ploceus galbula (A)
- Vieillot's black weaver, Ploceus nigerrimus
- Village weaver, Ploceus cucullatus
- Black-headed weaver, Ploceus melanocephalus
- Golden-backed weaver, Ploceus jacksoni
- Chestnut weaver, Ploceus rubiginosus
- Cinnamon weaver, Ploceus badius
- Yellow-mantled weaver, Ploceus tricolor (A)
- Forest weaver, Ploceus bicolor (A)
- Brown-capped weaver, Ploceus insignis
- Compact weaver, Pachyphantes superciliosus
- Cardinal quelea, Quelea cardinalis
- Red-headed quelea, Quelea erythrops
- Red-billed quelea, Quelea quelea
- Northern red bishop, Euplectes franciscanus
- Black-winged bishop, Euplectes hordeaceus
- Black bishop, Euplectes gierowii
- Yellow-crowned bishop, Euplectes afer
- Yellow bishop, Euplectes capensis
- White-winged widowbird, Euplectes albonotatus (A)
- Yellow-mantled widowbird, Euplectes macroura
- Red-collared widowbird, Euplectes ardens
- Red-cowled widowbird, Euplectes laticauda
- Fan-tailed widowbird, Euplectes axillaris
- Grosbeak weaver, Amblyospiza albifrons

== Waxbills and allies ==
Order: Passeriformes Family: Estrildidae

The estrildid finches are small passerine birds of the Old World tropics and Australasia. They are gregarious and often colonial seed eaters with short thick but pointed bills. They are all similar in structure and habits, but have wide variation in plumage colours and patterns.

- Gray-headed silverbill, Spermestes griseicapilla
- Bronze mannikin, Spermestes cucullatus
- Magpie mannikin, Spermestes fringilloides
- Black-and-white mannikin, Spermestes bicolor
- African silverbill, Euodice cantans
- Yellow-bellied waxbill, Coccopygia quartinia
- Green-backed twinspot, Mandingoa nitidula
- Abyssinian crimsonwing, Cryptospiza salvadorii
- Gray-headed nigrita, Nigrita canicapilla
- Gray-headed oliveback, Delacourella capistrata (A)
- Black-faced waxbill, Brunhilda erythronotos
- Black-cheeked waxbill, Brunhilda charmosyna (A)
- Black-crowned waxbill, Estrilda nonnula
- Fawn-breasted waxbill, Estrilda paludicola
- Common waxbill, Estrilda astrild
- Black-rumped waxbill, Estrilda troglodytes
- Crimson-rumped waxbill, Estrilda rhodopyga
- Quailfinch, Ortygospiza atricollis
- Cut-throat, Amadina fasciata
- Zebra waxbill, Amandava subflava
- Purple grenadier, Granatina ianthinogaster
- Red-cheeked cordonbleu, Uraeginthus bengalus
- Blue-capped cordonbleu, Uraeginthus cyanocephalus (A)
- Red-headed bluebill, Spermophaga ruficapilla
- Black-bellied seedcracker, Pyrenestes ostrinus (A)
- Green-winged pytilia, Pytilia melba
- Orange-winged pytilia, Pytilia afra (A)
- Red-winged pytilia, Pytilia phoenicoptera
- Red-billed pytilia, Pytilia lineata (A)
- Dybowski's twinspot, Euschistospiza dybowskii
- Brown twinspot, Clytospiza monteiri
- Red-billed firefinch, Lagonosticta senegala
- African firefinch, Lagonosticta rubricata
- Jameson's firefinch, Lagonosticta rhodopareia
- Black-bellied firefinch, Lagonosticta rara
- Bar-breasted firefinch, Lagonosticta rufopicta
- Black-faced firefinch, Lagonosticta larvata

== Indigobirds ==
Order: Passeriformes Family: Viduidae

The indigobirds are finch-like species which usually have black or indigo predominating in their plumage. All are brood parasites, which lay their eggs in the nests of estrildid finches.

- Pin-tailed whydah, Vidua macroura
- Sahel paradise-whydah, Vidua orientalis
- Exclamatory paradise-whydah, Vidua interjecta
- Eastern paradise-whydah, Vidua paradisaea
- Steel-blue whydah, Vidua hypocherina (A)
- Straw-tailed whydah, Vidua fischeri
- Village indigobird, Vidua chalybeata
- Wilson's indigobird, Vidua wilsoni
- Quailfinch indigobird, Vidua nigeriae
- Jambandu indigobird, Vidua raricola
- Baka indigobird, Vidua larvaticola
- Cameroon indigobird, Vidua camerunensis
- Parasitic weaver, Anomalospiza imberbis

== Old World sparrows ==
Order: Passeriformes Family: Passeridae

Old World sparrows are small passerine birds. In general, sparrows tend to be small, plump, brown or grey birds with short tails and short powerful beaks. Sparrows are seed eaters, but they also consume small insects. There are 11 species which have been recorded in South Sudan.

- House sparrow, Passer domesticus (I)
- Shelley's rufous sparrow, Passer shelleyi
- Northern gray-headed sparrow, Passer griseus
- Swainson's sparrow, Passer swainsonii
- Parrot-billed sparrow, Passer gongonensis
- Sudan golden sparrow, Passer luteus
- Chestnut sparrow, Passer eminibey
- Yellow-spotted bush sparrow, Gymnoris pyrgita
- Sahel bush sparrow, Gymnoris dentata

== Wagtails and pipits ==
Order: Passeriformes Family: Motacillidae

Motacillidae is a family of small passerine birds with medium to long tails. They include the wagtails, longclaws and pipits. They are slender, ground feeding insectivores of open country.

- Gray wagtail, Motacilla cinerea
- Western yellow wagtail, Motacilla flava
- African pied wagtail, Motacilla aguimp
- White wagtail, Motacilla alba
- African pipit, Anthus cinnamomeus
- Long-billed pipit, Anthus similis
- Tawny pipit, Anthus campestris (A)
- Plain-backed pipit, Anthus leucophrys
- Tree pipit, Anthus trivialis
- Red-throated pipit, Anthus cervinus
- Golden pipit, Tmetothylacus tenellus
- Yellow-throated longclaw, Macronyx croceus

== Finches, euphonias, and allies ==
Order: Passeriformes Family: Fringillidae

Finches are seed-eating passerine birds, that are small to moderately large and have a strong beak, usually conical and in some species very large. All have twelve tail feathers and nine primaries. These birds have a bouncing flight with alternating bouts of flapping and gliding on closed wings, and most sing well.

- Oriole finch, Linurgus olivaceus (A)
- White-rumped seedeater, Crithagra leucopygius
- Yellow-fronted canary, Crithagra mozambicus
- African citril, Crithagra citrinelloides
- Southern citril, Crithagra hypostictus
- Reichenow's seedeater, Crithagra reichenowi
- White-bellied canary, Crithagra dorsostriatus (A)
- Streaky seedeater, Crithagra striolatus
- Reichard's seedeater, Crithagra reichardi
- Yellow-crowned canary, Serinus flavivertex (A)

== Old World buntings ==
Order: Passeriformes Family: Emberizidae

The emberizids are a large family of passerine birds. They are seed-eating birds with distinctively shaped bills. Many emberizid species have distinctive head patterns. There are 6 species which have been recorded in South Sudan.

- Brown-rumped bunting, Emberiza affinis
- Cabanis's bunting, Emberiza cabanisi
- Golden-breasted bunting, Emberiza flaviventris
- Somali bunting, Emberiza poliopleura
- Cinnamon-breasted bunting, Emberiza tahapisi
- Gosling's bunting, Emberiza goslingi
- Striolated bunting, Emberiza striolata (A)

== See also ==
- List of birds
- Lists of birds by region
- List of mammals of South Sudan
