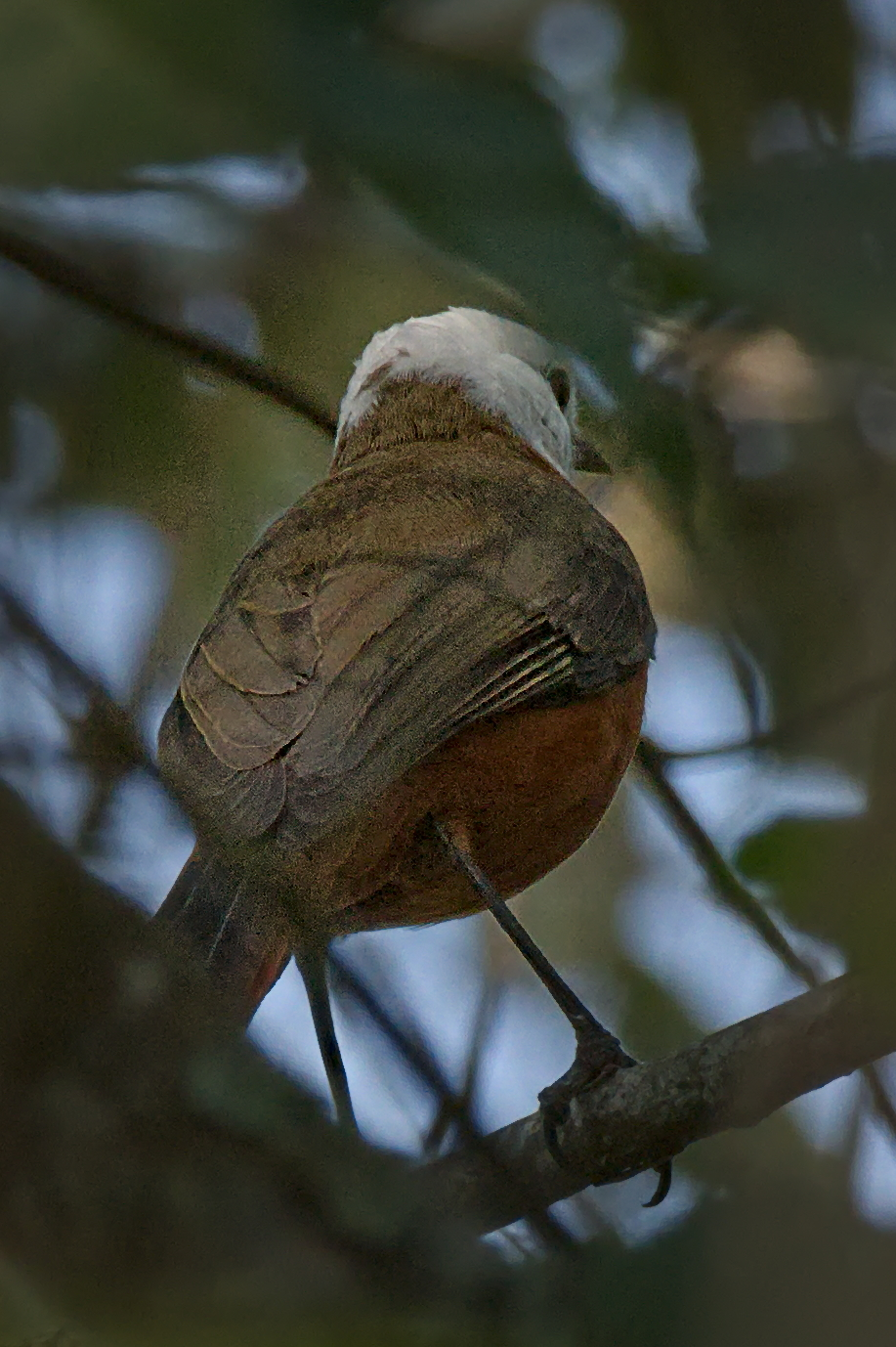

Conservation status
- Least Concern (IUCN 3.1)

Scientific classification
- Kingdom: Animalia
- Phylum: Chordata
- Class: Aves
- Order: Passeriformes
- Family: Muscicapidae
- Genus: Cossypha
- Species: C. heinrichi

Binomial name
- Cossypha heinrichi Rand, 1955

= White-headed robin-chat =

Species of bird

The white-headed robin-chat (Cossypha heinrichi) is a species of bird in the family Muscicapidae. It is found in northern Angola and the western Democratic Republic of the Congo. It is threatened by habitat loss, and its IUCN conservation status is the least concern.

== Taxonomy ==
In 1954, Gerd Heinrich collected bird specimens in Angola, and the specimens were shipped to the Chicago Natural History Museum. Three of the specimens were white-headed robin-chats, and in 1955, Austin L. Rand described them as Cossypha heinrichi. The species is monotypic.

== Description ==
The white-headed robin-chat is 22–23 cm (8.7–9.1 in) long and weighs 56–69 g (2.0–2.4 oz). The head and neck are white. The entirely white head is unique among the African robins. The mantle, back and scapulars are olive-brown, with the back and scapulars being greyer. The rump is rufous-orange. The central tail feathers are black, and the outer feathers are orange-rufous. The flight feathers and wing coverts are blackish brown, with olive-brown edges. The underwing coverts are grey. The underparts are rufous-chestnut or sienna. The beak is black, and the legs are grey or black. The female has a shorter tail than the male. The juvenile bird's head and breast are buffish-brown, and its back has orange-buff spots. It has browner underparts and brownish-grey legs. Juveniles moulting into first-year plumage have been observed in April and November.

== Distribution and habitat ==
In northern Angola, the white-headed robin-chat has only been recorded in two areas, including the type locality about 30 km (19 mi) north of Calandula. In the western Democratic Republic of the Congo, it has been recorded in Bombo-Lumene Forest Reserve and a few nearby sites. In Angola, the bird occurs in the undergrowth of gallery forests at an elevation of 1,250 m (4,100 ft), and it is sometimes found in savannas. In the Democratic Republic of the Congo, it has been found in isolated patches of thick forest.

== Behaviour ==
The white-headed robin-chat eats insects, foraging for driver ants on the ground and also catching insects in the air. Its song is repeated whistles that begin quietly and then become much louder. A high-pitched whistle has also been recorded. During observations in 2005, playback of its voicalizations elicited a "frantic" response. The bird frequently fans its tail. Although its breeding are poorly known, observations in Angola suggest a breeding season spanning February, October and November. In the Democratic Republic of the Congo, it breeds from September to November.

== Status ==
The population size is estimated at 6,000 to 15,000 mature individuals and 10,000 to 19,999 total individuals. The population is probably declining because of habitat loss. In Bombo-Lumene Forest Reserve, the species is threatened by deforestation for charcoal. In Angola, forest clearance and slash-and-burn agriculture threaten it. Despite oits small range and threatened habitat, the IUCN Red List of Threatened Species has assessed the species as least concern.
