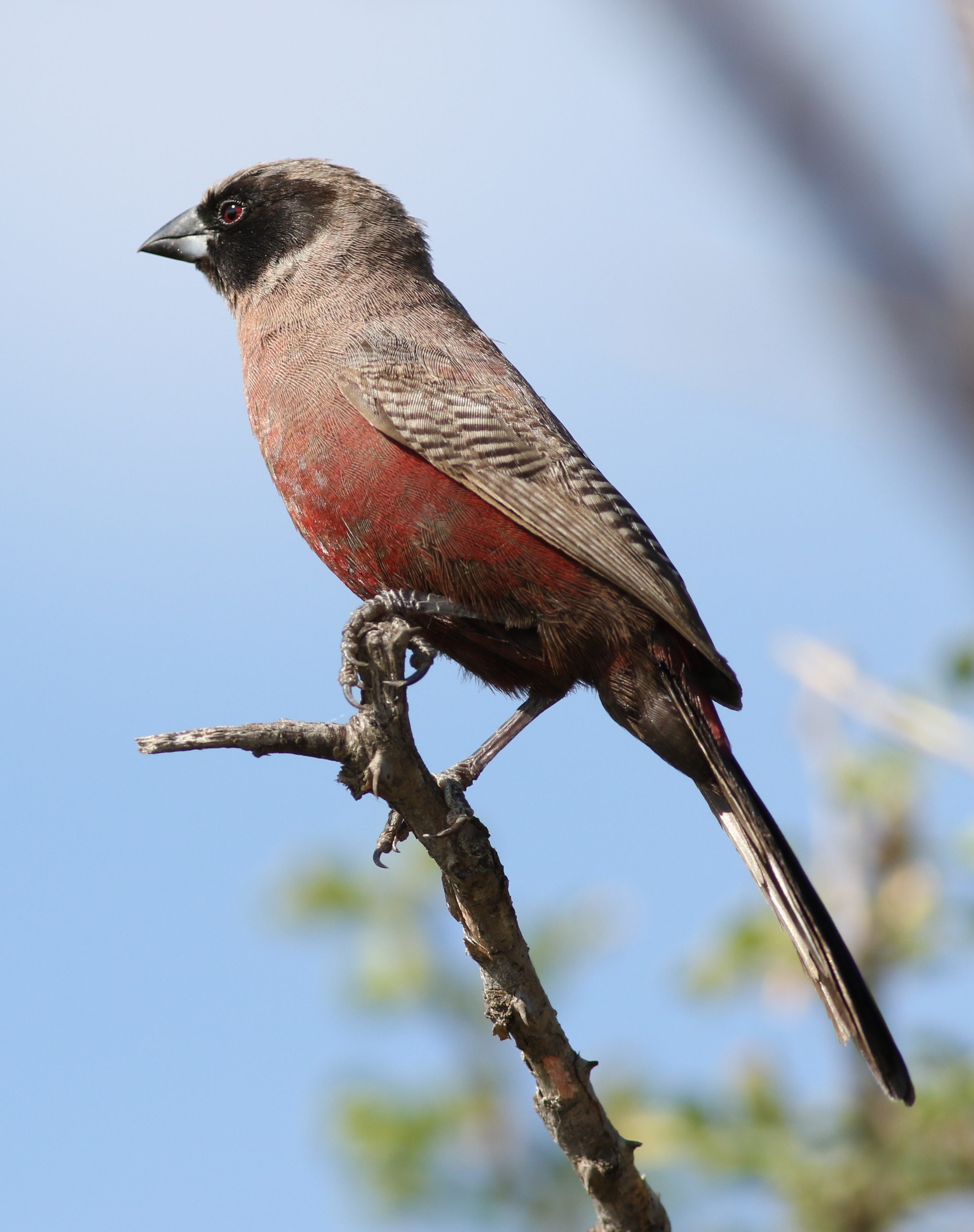

Conservation status
- Least Concern (IUCN 3.1)

Scientific classification
- Kingdom: Animalia
- Phylum: Chordata
- Class: Aves
- Order: Passeriformes
- Family: Estrildidae
- Genus: Brunhilda
- Species: B. erythronotos

Binomial name
- Brunhilda erythronotos (Vieillot, 1817)

Synonyms
- Estrilda erythronotos

= Black-faced waxbill =

Species of bird

The black-faced waxbill (Brunhilda erythronotos) is a common species of estrildid finch found in southern Africa. It is found in Angola, Botswana, Kenya, Namibia, Rwanda, South Africa, Tanzania, Uganda, Zambia and Zimbabwe. The IUCN has classified the species as being of least concern.

== Taxonomy ==
The black-faced waxbill was formally described in 1817 by the French ornithologist Louis Pierre Vieillot and given the binary name Fringilla erythronotos. The specific epithet combines the Ancient Greek eruthros meaning "red" and -nōtos meaning "-backed". The type locality is Kurrichane (Kaditshwene) in the North West province of South Africa. This species was formerly placed in the genus Estrilda. When a molecular phylogenetic study published in 2020 found that Estrilda was paraphyletic, the genus Brunhilda was resurrected for this species and the black-cheeked waxbill.

Two subspecies are recognised:

- B. e. delamerei (Sharpe, 1900) – southwest Uganda, west Kenya to central Tanzania
- B. e. erythronotos (Vieillot, 1817) – Angola and Namibia to Zimbabwe and north South Africa
