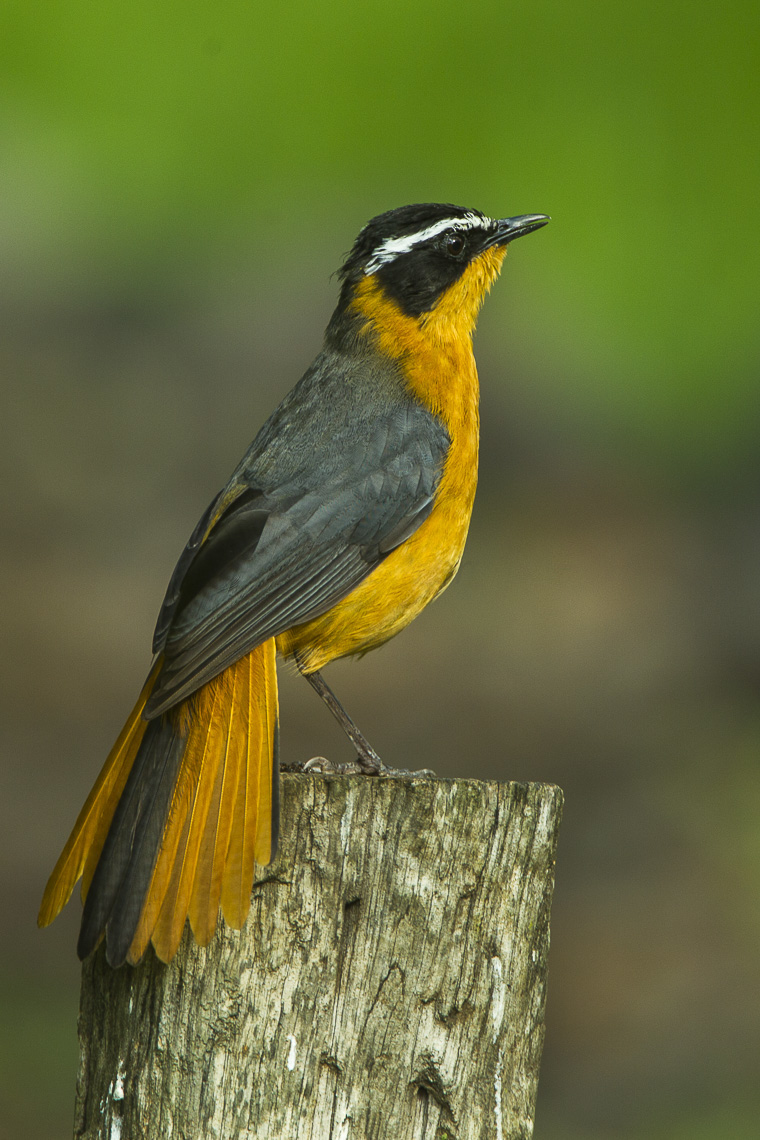
- C. s. intercedens in Kenya

Conservation status
- Least Concern (IUCN 3.1)

Scientific classification
- Kingdom: Animalia
- Phylum: Chordata
- Class: Aves
- Order: Passeriformes
- Family: Muscicapidae
- Genus: Cossypha
- Species: C. semirufa

Binomial name
- Cossypha semirufa (Rüppell, 1837)

= Rüppell's robin-chat =

Species of bird

Rüppell's robin-chat (Cossypha semirufa) is a species of bird in the family Muscicapidae, that is native to the Afrotropics. It is named for the German naturalist Eduard Rüppell.

== Description ==
It is a smaller version of the White-browed robin-chat, measuring 18 cm rather than 20 cm, with darker, blackish central tail feathers, and in some races a more constricted supercilium behind the eye.

== Range ==
It is native to Eritrea, Ethiopia, Kenya, South Sudan and Tanzania.

== Habitat ==
It is found in subtropical or tropical moist montane forests, including Juniper and Podocarpus forest, and in subtropical or tropical moist shrubland and gardens.

== Races ==
There are three races:

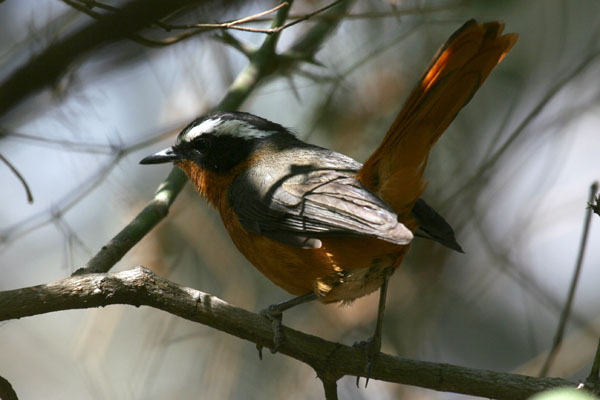
The nominate race in Ethiopia

- Cossypha semirufa semirufa

Range: Eritrea, Ethiopia, south-eastern South Sudan and northern Kenya

- Cossypha semirufa donaldsoni Sharpe, 1895

Description: Rufous collar almost complete, upperparts darker than nominate
Range: south-eastern Ethiopia and adjacent Somalia

- Cossypha semirufa intercedens (Cabanis, 1878)

Range: central to south-eastern Kenya and northern Tanzania
