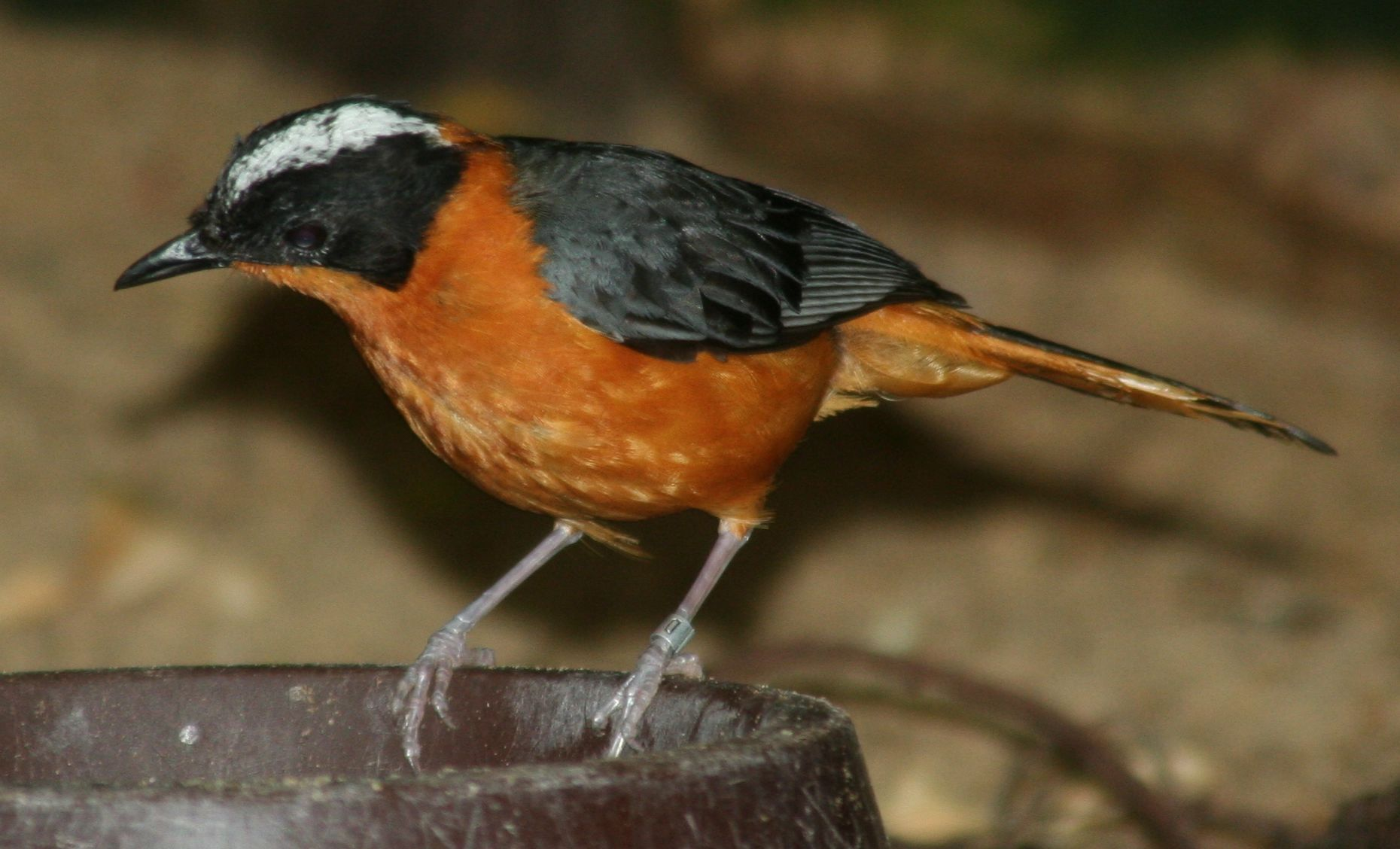
- Snowy-crowned robin-chat (Cossypha niveicapilla)

Scientific classification
- Kingdom: Animalia
- Phylum: Chordata
- Class: Aves
- Order: Passeriformes
- Family: Muscicapidae
- Genus: Cossypha; Vigors, 1825

Type species
- Turdus vociferans Swainson, 1823=Muscicapa dichroa Gmelin, 1789

= Cossypha =

Genus of birds

Cossypha is a genus of small insectivorous birds in the Old World flycatcher family Muscicapidae. They are African woodland dwelling species, but some have become adapted to sites around human habitation. All have robin-chat in their English name.

== Taxonomy ==
The genus Cossypha was introduced in 1825 by the rish zoologist Nicholas Vigors with Turdus vociferans Swainson, 1823, as the type species. This species name is a junior synonym of Muscicapa dichroa Gmelin, 1789, the chorister robin-chat. The genus name is from Ancient Greek κοσσυφος/kossuphos meaning "thrush".

== Species ==
The genus contains the following eight species:

Image	Common name	Scientific name	Distribution
	White-crowned robin-chat	Cossypha albicapillus	Sudanian savanna
	White-browed robin-chat	Cossypha heuglini	Sub-Saharan Africa (rare in western and southern Africa)
	Chorister robin-chat	Cossypha dichroa	eastern southern Africa
	Rüppell's robin-chat	Cossypha semirufa	eastern Afromontane
	Snowy-crowned robin-chat	Cossypha niveicapilla	northern Sub-Saharan Africa
	Red-capped robin-chat	Cossypha natalensis	central and eastern Sub-Saharan Africa
	White-headed robin-chat	Cossypha heinrichi	northern Angola and western DR Congo
	Blue-shouldered robin-chat	Cossypha cyanocampter	African tropical rainforest
