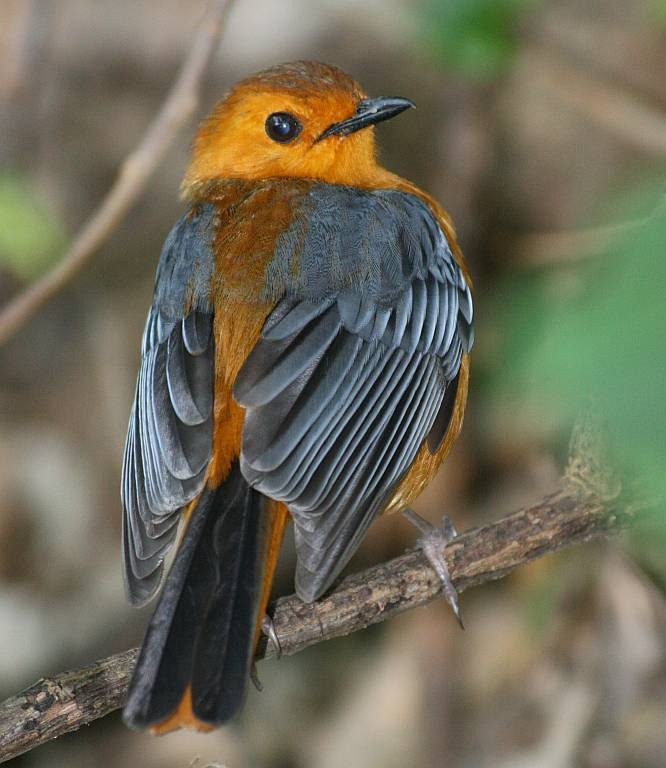
- In coastal KwaZulu-Natal, South Africa

Conservation status
- Least Concern (IUCN 3.1)

Scientific classification
- Kingdom: Animalia
- Phylum: Chordata
- Class: Aves
- Order: Passeriformes
- Family: Muscicapidae
- Genus: Cossypha
- Species: C. natalensis

Binomial name
- Cossypha natalensis Smith, 1840

= Red-capped robin-chat =

Species of bird

The red-capped robin-chat or Natal robin (Cossypha natalensis) is a species of passerine bird belonging to the family Muscicapidae. This species is found in central and eastern Sub-Saharan Africa.

== Taxonomy ==
The red-capped robin-chat was first formally described in 1840 by the Scottish zoologist and physician Andrew Smith with its type locality given as near Port Natal in KwaZulu-Natal, South Africa. This species is a member of the genus Cossypha which is classified within the subfamily Erithacinae of the large passerine family Muscicapidae, the chats and Old World flycatchers. However, it has been argued that the name of this clade should be Cossyphinae, as this was proposed by Nicholas Aylward Vigors in 1825 and so predates Gray's 1846 Erithacinae.

=== Subspecies ===
The red-capped robin-chat is a polytypic species with 3 subspecies:

- Cossypha natalensis natalensis (Smith, 1840) - eastern South Africa (Eastern Cape to KwaZulu-Natal)
- Cossypha natalensis larischi Meise, 1958 - Nigeria to northern Angola
- Cossypha natalensis intensa Mearns, 1913 - southeastern Central African Republic, South Sudan, southwestern Ethiopia, and southern Somalia south to Southern Africa.

== Etymology ==
The red-capped robin-chat had the genus name Cossypha, a name introduced by the Irish zoologist Nicholas Aylward Vigors in 1825. The word comes from the Classical Greek kossuphos for a blackbird or thrush. The specific name natalensis refers to the type locality.

== Description ==
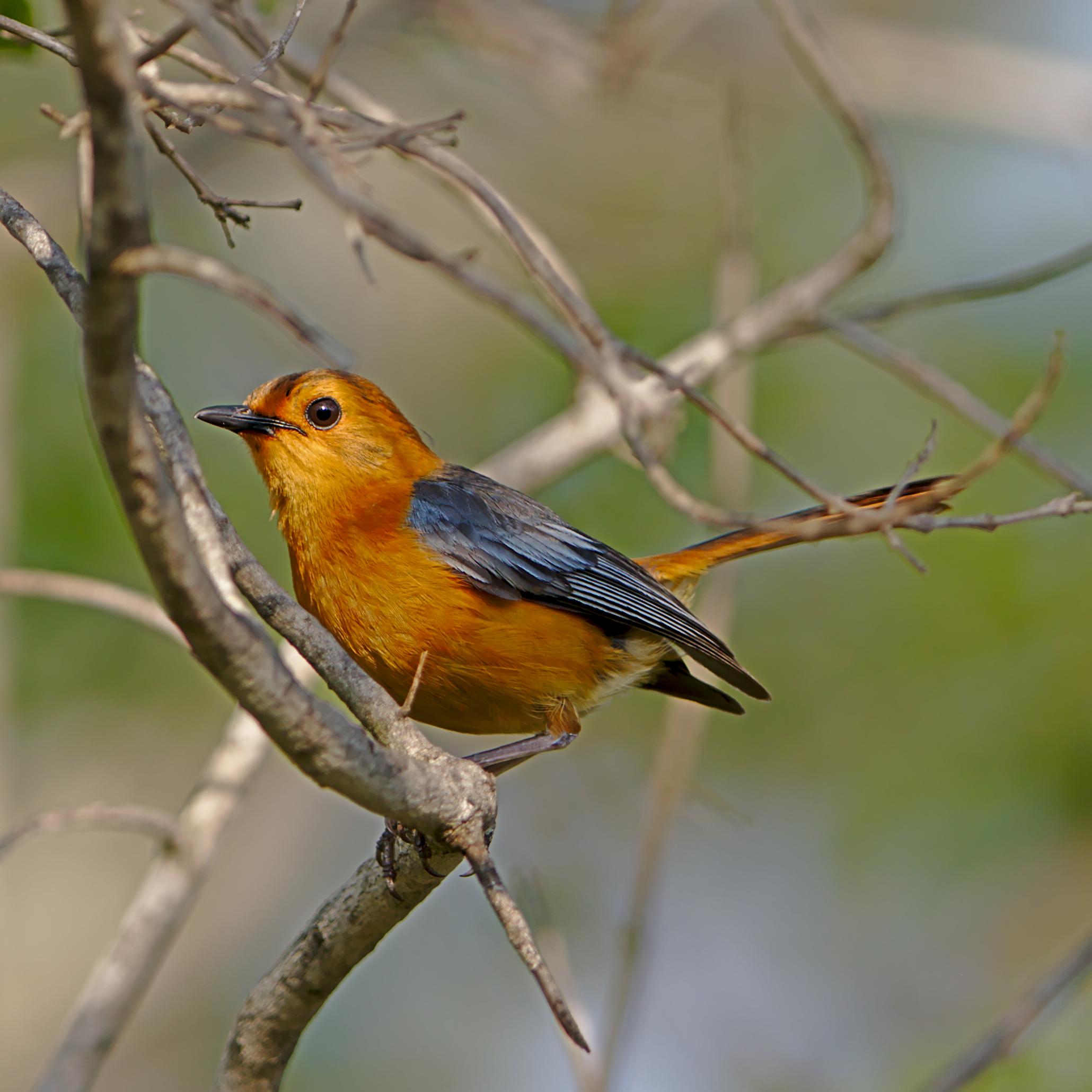
Individual in Ithala Game Reserve, showing brightly coloured underpart plumage

The red-capped robin-chat is a relatively large species of robin-chat with a length of 15.5 to 19 cm (6.1 to 7.5 in). The adults have an orange-rufous head, face, breast and belly with a large dark eye. The overall appearance of the head is of a plain face with the dark eye in its centre. The wings and upperparts of the body are dusky and these contrast with the dark central and bright orange outer tail feathers. The juveniles are a mottled dark brown with rufous-brown spots on the head. The upper and underparts have rufous spots, these become larger towards the belly.

=== Subspecific variation ===
The above applies to the nominate subspecies, C. n. natalensis. The subspecies C. c. intensa is similar to the nominate but the crown and nape are a brighter reddish colour, with no olive tones, and is slightly paler orange-rufous on the head and underparts. The subspecies C.c. larischii has slightly darker upperparts than the nominate, particularly on the crown and nape and has a lightly shorter tail.

=== Vocalisations ===
The red-capped robin chat has a plaintive, tremulous contact call and has other fluty vocalisations, similar to those of other robin-chats. The song is a long series of melodious whistles with a lot of mimicry included.

== Distribution and habitat ==
=== Range ===
The red-capped robin-chat has a wide distribution in eastern and southern Africa. C. n. larischi is found in central and south eastern Nigeria, near Yaoundé in Cameroon, southwestern Gabon and southern Republic of Congo as far north as the Téké Plateau and south into northern and western Angola. The most wodespread sunspecies is C.n. intensa which occurs as far north as South Sudan, southwestern Ethiopia and southern Somalia south to northwestern and eastern Zimbabwe and northern and central Mozambique where it intergrades with the nominate subspecies which is found in southern Mozambique, Eswatini and northeastern and southeastern South Africa in Limpopo Province, KwaZulu-Natal as far as the Transkei District in the Eastern Cape.

=== Habitat ===
The red-capped robin-chat is a bird that lives in the undergrowth of evergreen forest, this includes coastal forests, riverine forests, sand forests and highland forests below the cloud forest level. During the summer it expands its range to include well vegetated gullies and tickets within drier habitats such as bushveld and thornveld. In KwaZulu-Natal this is a common species of gardens where it lives in shrubberies.

=== Movements ===
The red-capped robin-chat is both sedentary and partially migratory, with 1st calendar year birds being nomadic. The northern most populations in South Sudan are very rare in the period between December and February, returning to their breeding territories in early March. It is a dry season visitor to coastal areas in Tanzania and Mozambique, while in Zimbabwe it is absent from the higher parts of the Eastern Highlands between March and late August. In many areas it is known as a nomadic, dry season visitor with sporadic and fleeting appearances. Vagrants have been recorded from Botswana, the Western Cape and Orange Free State.

== Biology ==
The red-capped robin chat builds a nest that is an open cup set into a platform; the materials used to create the nest are highly variable and will often include dead leaves, roots, tendrils, twigs, dry grass and flowerheads, lichen, moss, bark fragments or even hippopotamus droppings. It is usually situated in a hollow tree stump, in a rotten hole or crack in a branch and sometimes in a cavity in a dry side of a gully. The nest is built by both sexes. This is a monogamous and territorial species and the breeding season varies across its range, normally breeding during the rainy season. The territory is vigorously defended against conspecifics. It is known to hybridise with the chorister robin-chat (C. dichroa). The clutch varies between 2 and 4 eggs, and the female incubates the clutch on her own, the eggs hatch after around 2 weeks and the female broods the young, on and off, for the first week after hatching. The young fledge after 11 or 12 days, although 17 days has been recorded. The juveniles are dependent on their parents for approximately 6 weeks after fledging. The red-chested cuckoo (Cuculus solitarius) has been recorded as a brood parasite of the red-capped robin-chat. This species is both insectivorous and frugivorous and has been recorded feeding on a wide variety of invertebrates and fruit. Invertebrates are mainly found by searching through the leaf litter, or sometimes by catching them in flight on tree trunks and in the air. Fruit is taken mainly from the canopy. It will forage on the periphery of driver ant columns and in mixed species flocks. It has been recorded foraging around other birds and mammals, catching disturbed insects.
