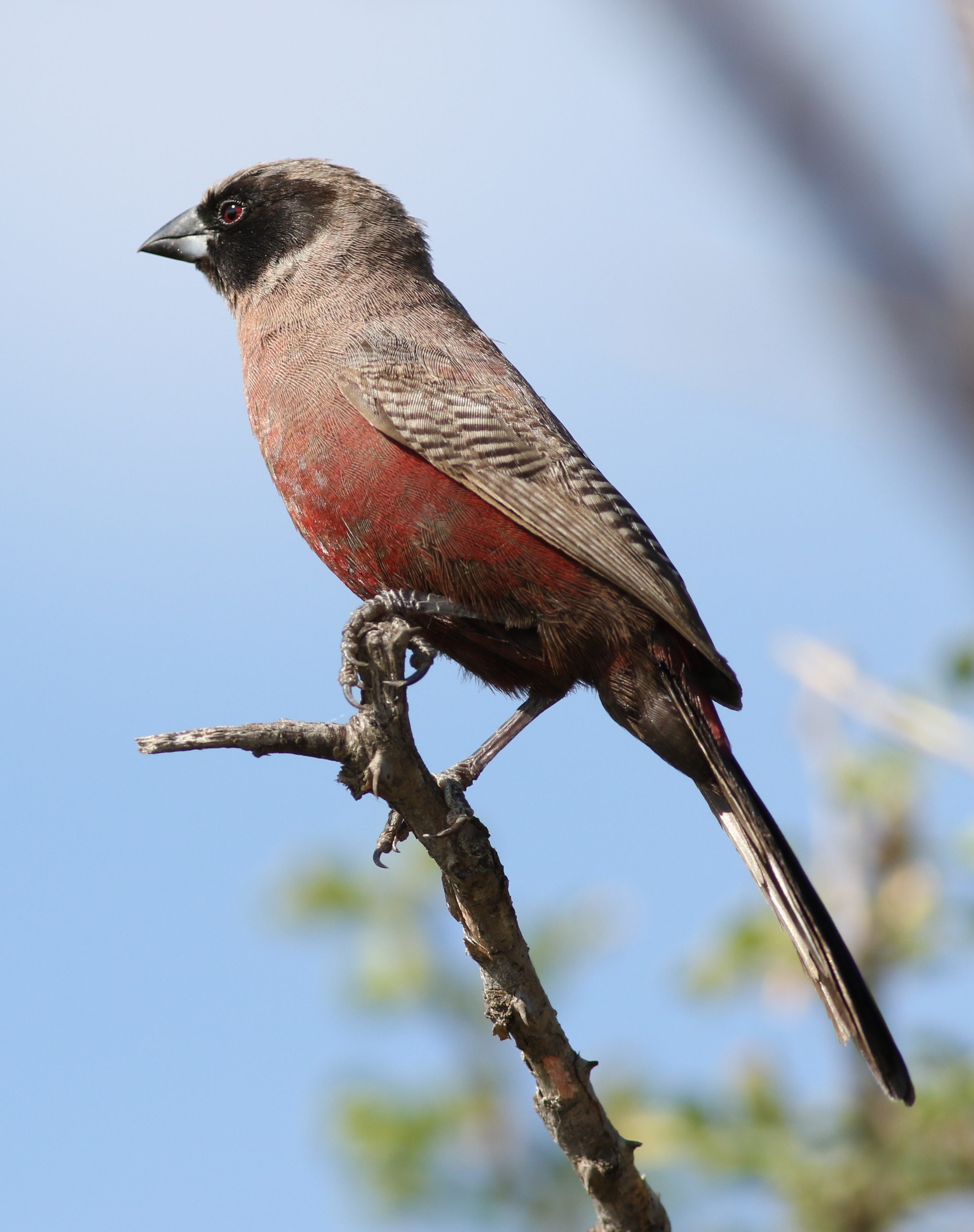
- Black-faced waxbill (Brunhilda erythronotos)

Scientific classification
- Kingdom: Animalia
- Phylum: Chordata
- Class: Aves
- Order: Passeriformes
- Family: Estrildidae
- Genus: Brunhilda; Reichenbach, 1862

Type species
- Fringilla erythronotos black-faced waxbill Vieillot, 1817

= Brunhilda (bird) =

Genus of birds

Brunhilda is a genus of small seed-eating birds in the waxbill family Estrildidae. The species are found in Sub-Saharan Africa.

== Taxonomy ==
The genus Brunhilda was introduced in 1862 by the German naturalist Ludwig Reichenbach for the black-faced waxbill. Brunhild is a female character of Germanic and Norse legend. The genus was considered as a junior synonym of Estrilda but was resurrected when a molecular phylogenetic study published in 2020 found that Estrilda was paraphyletic.

== Species ==
The genus contains the following two species:

Genus Brunhilda – Reichenbach, 1862 – two species
Common name	Scientific name and subspecies	Range	Size and ecology	IUCN status and estimated population
Black-cheeked waxbill	Brunhilda charmosyna (Reichenow, 1881) Two subspecies: B. c. charmosyna (Reichenow, 1881); B. c. kiwanukae (Van Someren, 1919)	Ethiopia, Kenya, Somalia, South Sudan and Tanzania	Size: Habitat: Diet:	LC
Black-faced waxbill	Brunhilda erythronotos (Vieillot, 1817) Two subspecies: B. e. delamerei (Sharpe, 1900); B. e. erythronotos (Vieillot, 1817)	Angola, Botswana, Kenya, Namibia, Rwanda, South Africa, Tanzania, Uganda, Zambia and Zimbabwe	Size: Habitat: Diet:	LC
