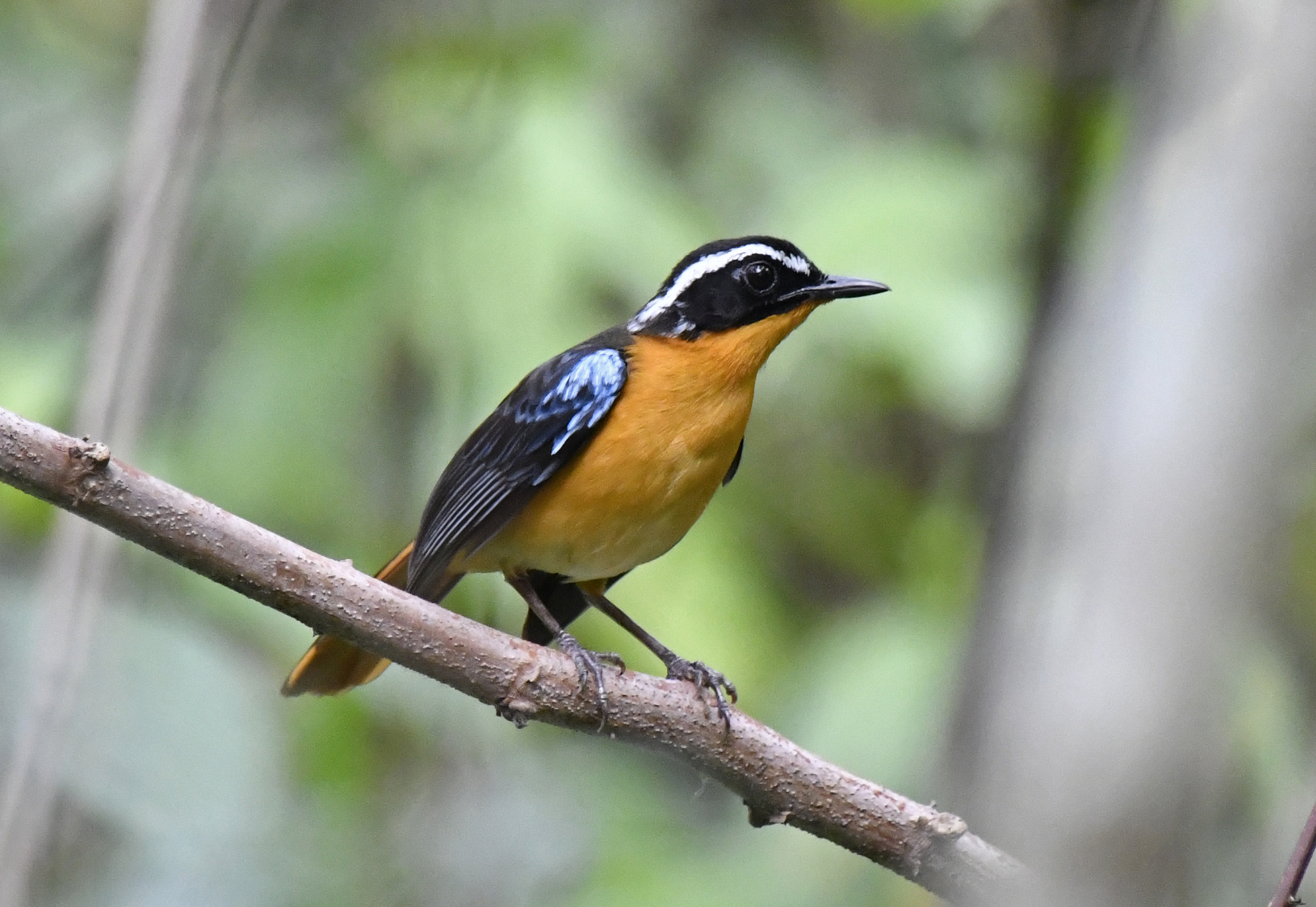

Conservation status
- Least Concern (IUCN 3.1)

Scientific classification
- Kingdom: Animalia
- Phylum: Chordata
- Class: Aves
- Order: Passeriformes
- Family: Muscicapidae
- Genus: Cossypha
- Species: C. cyanocampter

Binomial name
- Cossypha cyanocampter (Bonaparte, 1850)

= Blue-shouldered robin-chat =

Species of bird

The blue-shouldered robin-chat (Cossypha cyanocampter) is a species of bird in the family Muscicapidae. It is widespread across the African tropical rainforest. Its natural habitats are subtropical or tropical moist lowland forests and subtropical or tropical moist montane forests.
