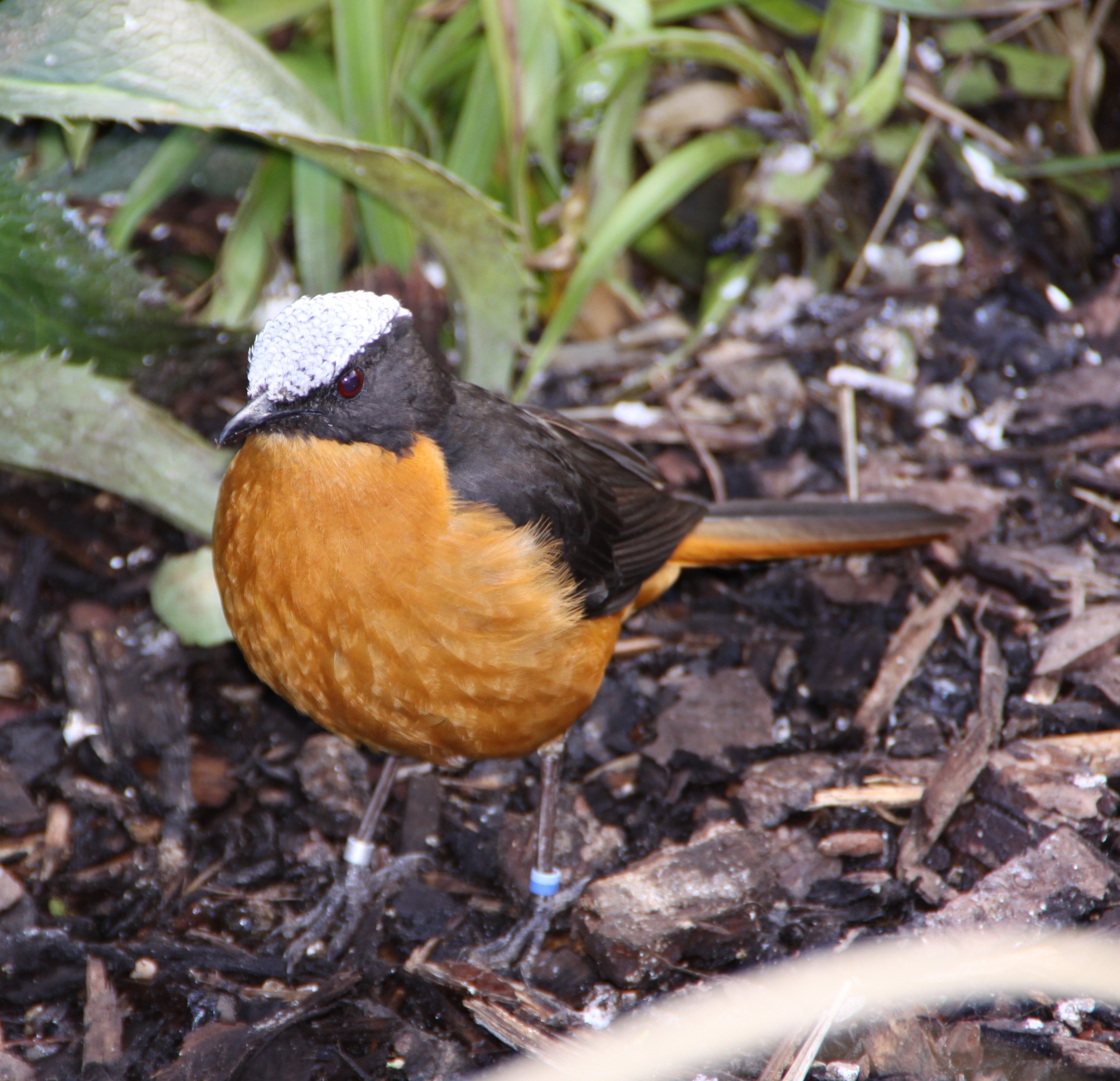
- At London Zoo, England

Conservation status
- Least Concern (IUCN 3.1)

Scientific classification
- Kingdom: Animalia
- Phylum: Chordata
- Class: Aves
- Order: Passeriformes
- Family: Muscicapidae
- Genus: Cossypha
- Species: C. albicapillus

Binomial name
- Cossypha albicapillus (Vieillot, 1818)

= White-crowned robin-chat =

Species of bird

The white-crowned robin-chat (Cossypha albicapillus) is a species of bird in the family Muscicapidae. Its range extends mainly across the western region of the Sudanian savanna. Its natural habitats are dry savanna and subtropical or tropical moist shrubland.

It has typically been assumed to be monogamous. However, at least one instance of cooperative breeding and possible multiple paternity has been observed.

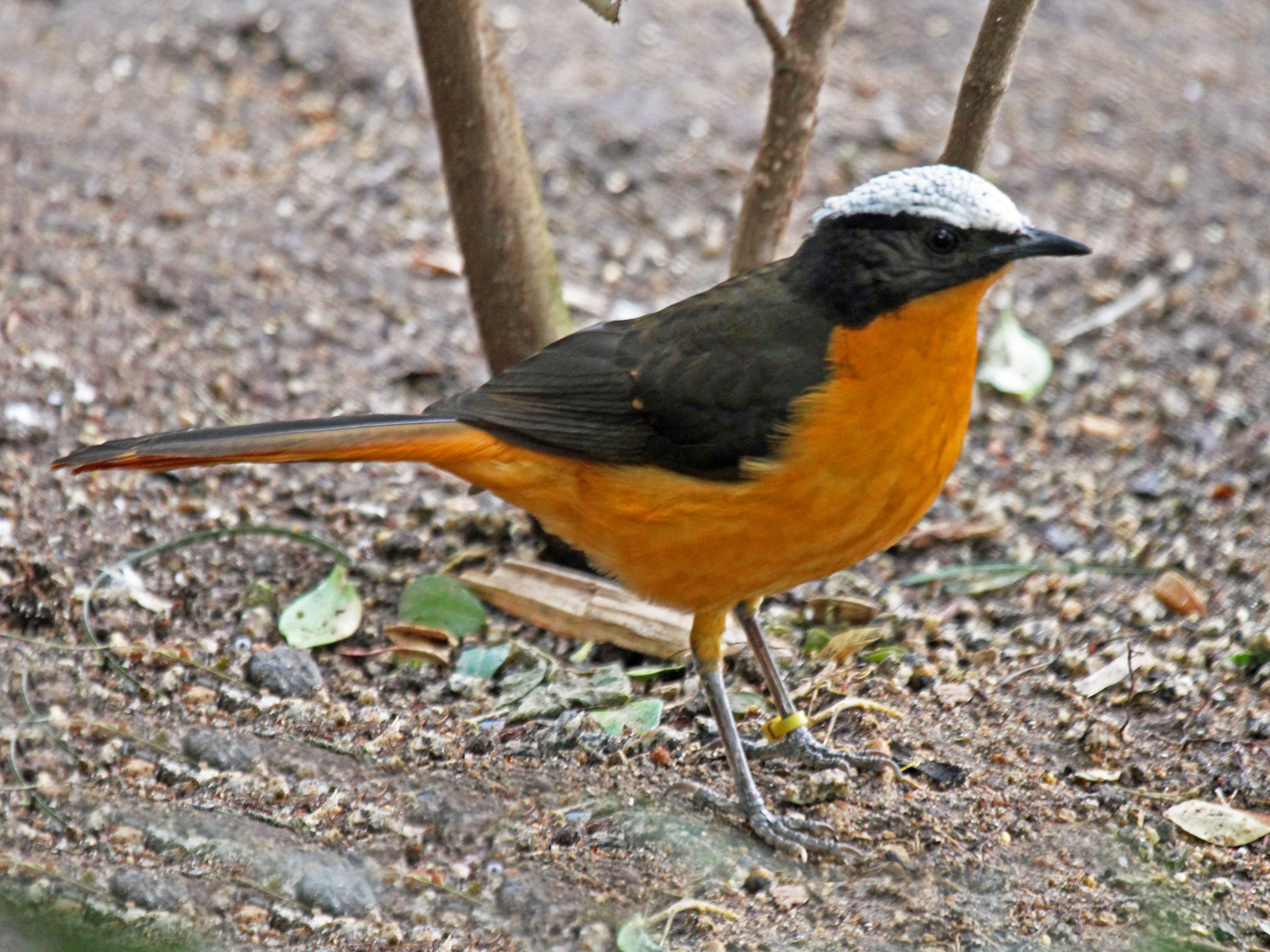
At San Diego Zoo
