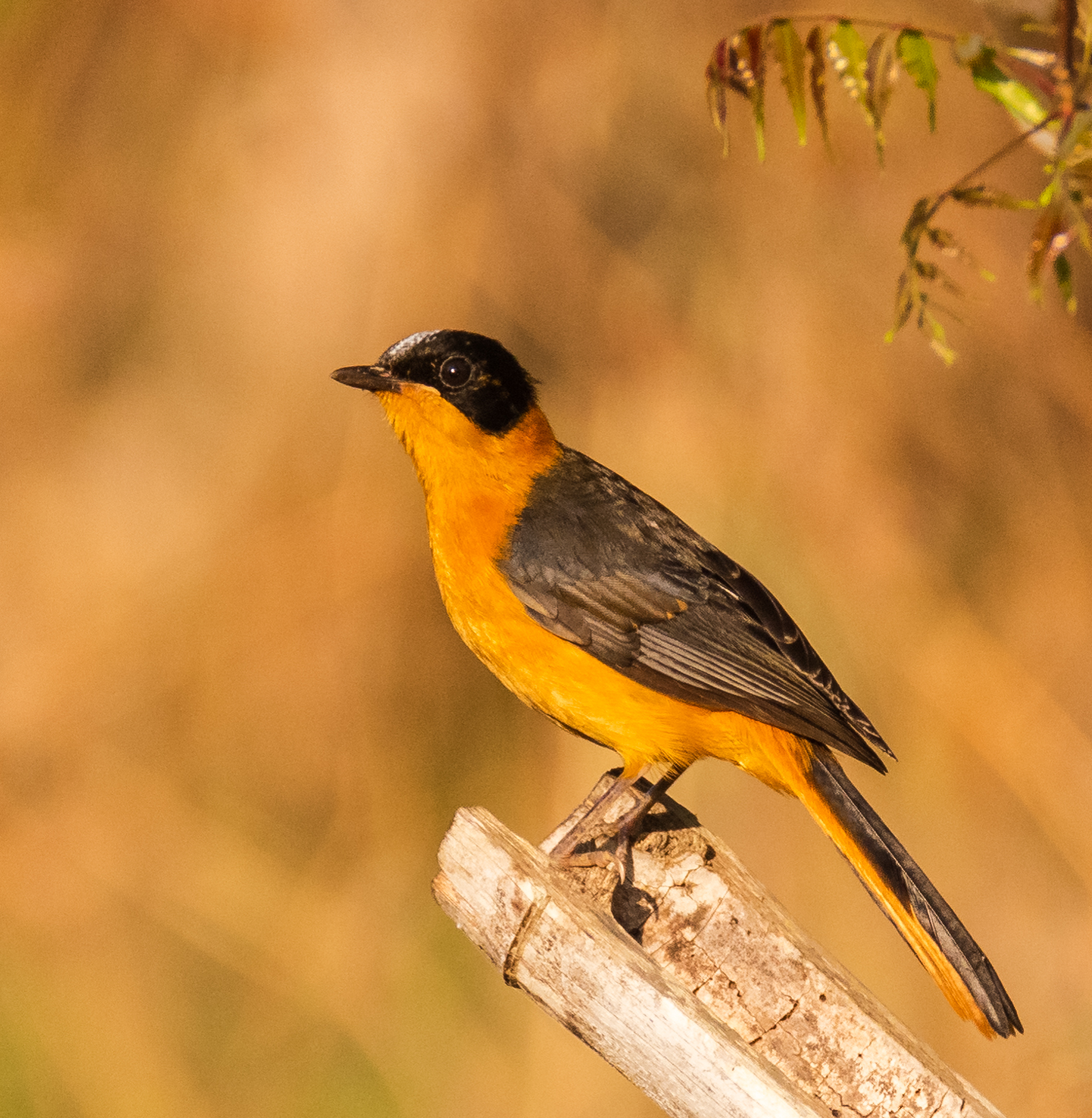
- Kwara state, Nigeria

Conservation status
- Least Concern (IUCN 3.1)

Scientific classification
- Kingdom: Animalia
- Phylum: Chordata
- Class: Aves
- Order: Passeriformes
- Family: Muscicapidae
- Genus: Cossypha
- Species: C. niveicapilla

Binomial name
- Cossypha niveicapilla (Lafresnaye, 1838)

= Snowy-crowned robin-chat =

Species of bird

The snowy-crowned robin-chat (Cossypha niveicapilla) is a species of bird in the family Muscicapidae. It is also known as the snowy-headed robin-chat. Its disjunct range extends across the northern half of Sub-Saharan Africa (rare in the Horn of Africa). Its natural habitats are subtropical or tropical dry forest, subtropical or tropical moist lowland forest, and moist savanna.

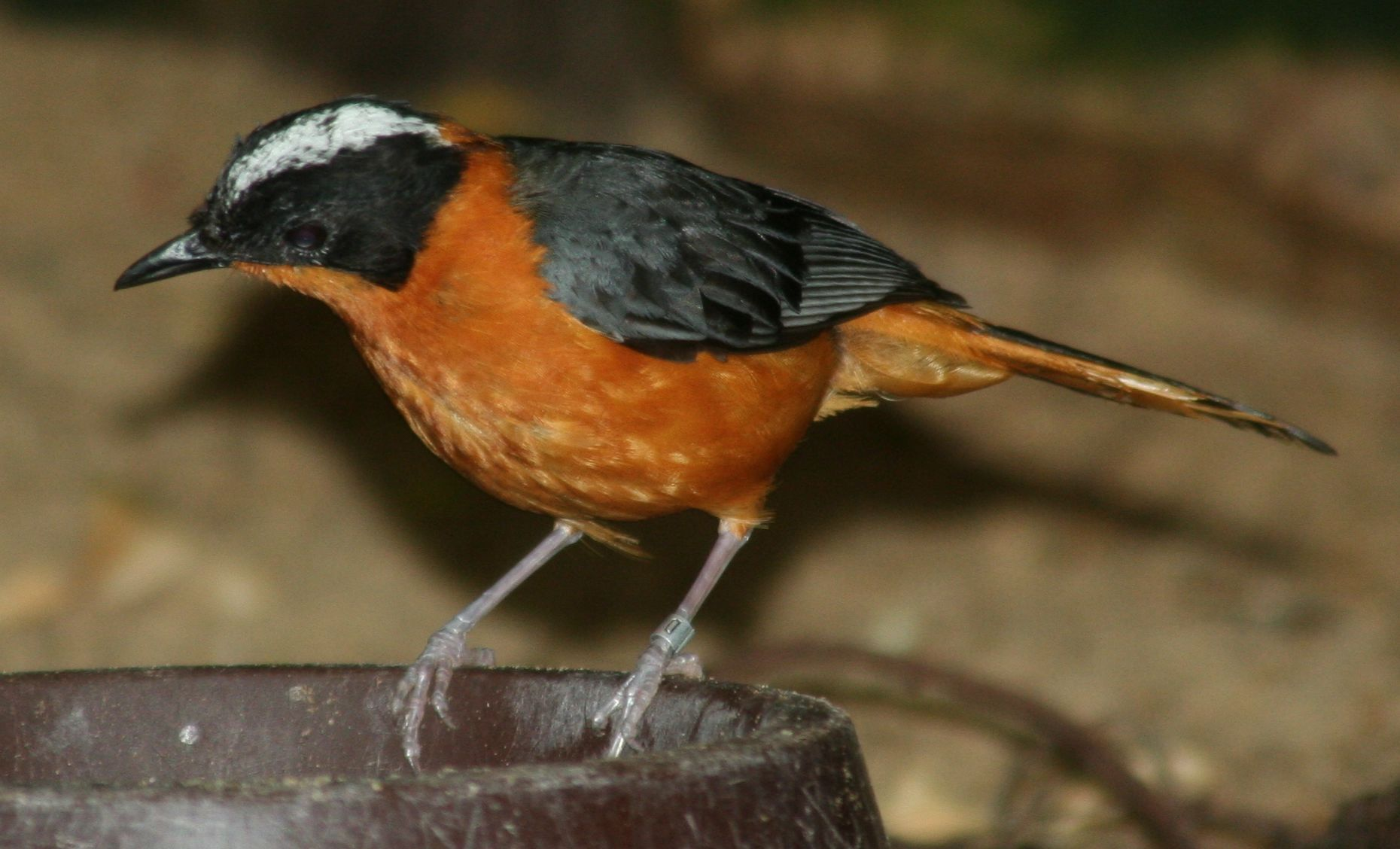
