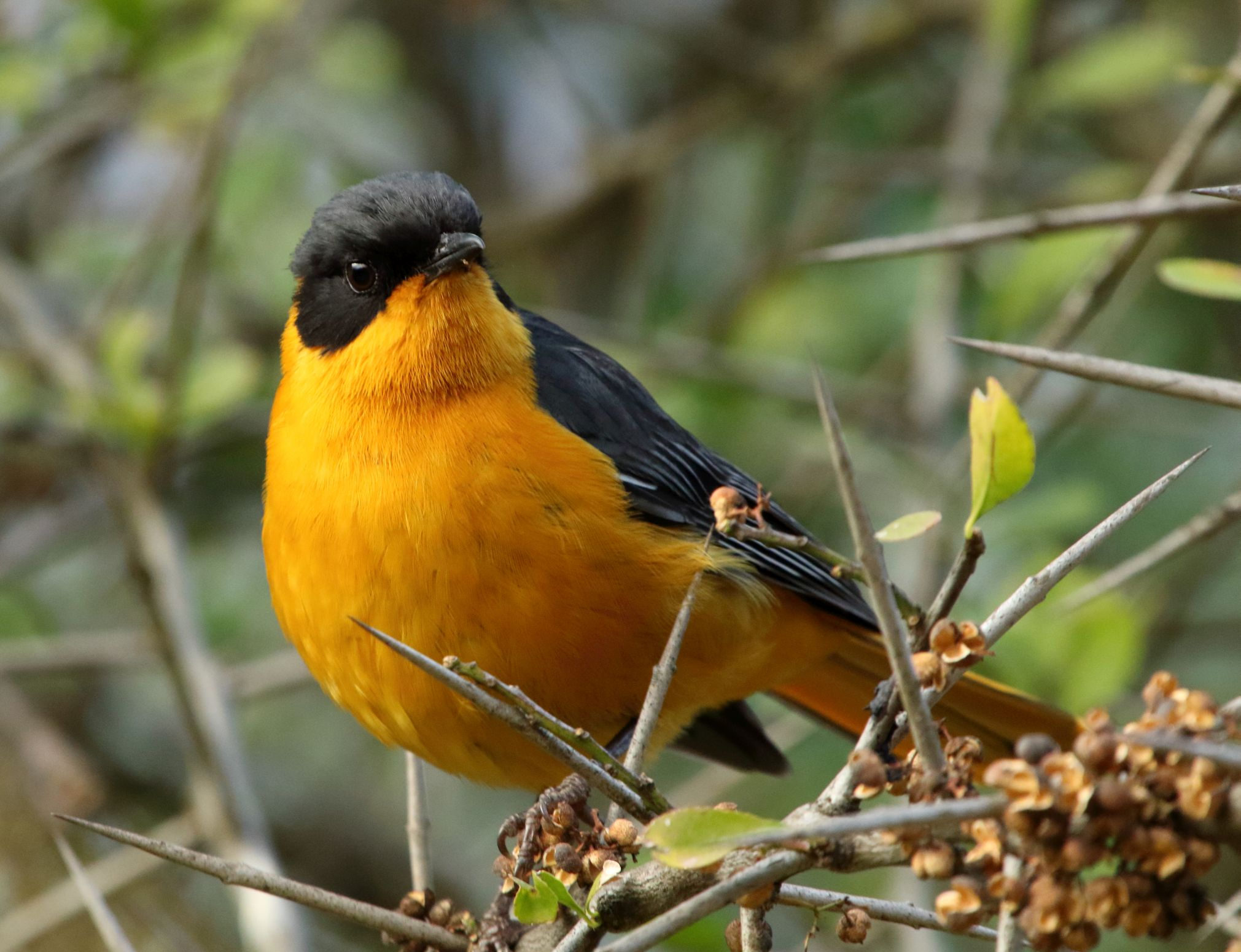

Conservation status
- Least Concern (IUCN 3.1)

Scientific classification
- Kingdom: Animalia
- Phylum: Chordata
- Class: Aves
- Order: Passeriformes
- Family: Muscicapidae
- Genus: Cossypha
- Species: C. dichroa

Binomial name
- Cossypha dichroa (Gmelin, JF, 1789)

= Chorister robin-chat =

Species of bird

The chorister robin-chat (Cossypha dichroa) (previously known as the chorister robin) is a species of bird in the Old World flycatcher family Muscicapidae. It is found in South Africa and Eswatini. Its distribution stretches from the southern Western Cape through the Eastern Cape, KwaZulu-Natal, and Mpumalanga to northern Limpopo. Its natural habitat is evergreen forests, especially in the mist belt region.

== Taxonomy ==
The chorister robin-chat was formally described in 1789 by the German naturalist Johann Friedrich Gmelin in his revised and expanded edition of Carl Linnaeus's Systema Naturae. He placed it with the flycatchers in the genus Muscicapa and coined the binomial name Muscicapa dichroa. Gmelin specified the locality as South Africa. This was restricted to Knysna in Western Cape province by Phillip Clancey in 1966.

Gmelin based his account on the "Muscicapa bicolor" that had been described and illustrated in 1787 by the Swedish naturalist Anders Sparrman. The hand-coloured engraved plate had been drawn by Jonas Carl Linnerhielm. The combination Muscicapa bicolor had been previously introduced in 1783 by the Dutch naturalist Pieter Boddaert for a different taxon and therefore under the rules of the International Code of Zoological Nomenclature Muscicapa bicolor Sparrman, 1787 is a junior homonym and is permanently invalid. The senior homonym Muscicapa bicolor Boddaert, 1783 is a junior synonym of Merops pusillus Müller, PLS, 1776, the little bee-eater. The chorister robin-chat is now placed in the genus Cossypha that was introduced in 1825 by Nicholas Vigors.

Two subspecies are recognised:

- C. d. dichroa (Gmelin, JF, 1789) – Eswatini (formerly Swaziland) and south South Africa
- C. d. mimica Clancey, 1981 – north South Africa

== Description ==
This is a large robin-chat, about 20 cm (7.9 in) in length. It is identified by its dark upperparts (the ear coverts and lores are slightly darker than the rest of the face, head, neck and back) and yellow-orange underparts. It has no white eye stripe. Juveniles have a sooty, mottled tawny-buff above and below and its tail is red-orange with a dark centre.

== Behaviour ==
=== Feeding ===
The chorister robin-chat is generally solitary. It forages in the forest canopy where it gleans insects from leaves but from April to September during the non-breeding season it may also forage on the ground. Its diet consists mainly of insects, millipedes, spiders, ticks but also fruit in the non-breeding season.

=== Breeding ===
Breeding takes place from October to early January. The open cup nest is built by the female and is usually placed less than 5 m (16 ft) above the ground in a hole or crevice in a tree trunk. Sometimes the nest will be placed on the ground. The three eggs in the clutch are pale blue, blue-green, olive-green or olive-brown. They occasionally have dark spots. The eggs are incubated for 15–19 days. The young fledge after 14–15 days but remain with their parents for up to six weeks.
