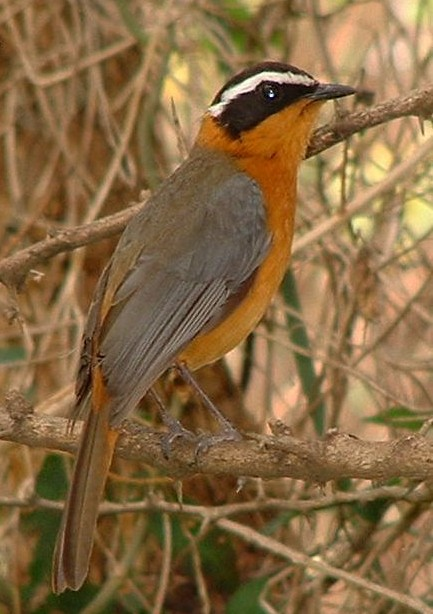

Conservation status
- Least Concern (IUCN 3.1)

Scientific classification
- Kingdom: Animalia
- Phylum: Chordata
- Class: Aves
- Order: Passeriformes
- Family: Muscicapidae
- Genus: Cossypha
- Species: C. heuglini

Binomial name
- Cossypha heuglini Hartlaub, 1866

Audio
- Song recorded in Chepareria, Kenya

= White-browed robin-chat =

Species of bird

The white-browed robin-chat (Cossypha heuglini), also known as Heuglin's robin, is a species of bird in the family Muscicapidae. Found in east, central and southern Africa, its natural habitats include riverine forest and thickets, and it is also found near humans. The IUCN classifies it as a least-concern species.

== Taxonomy ==
Hartlaub described the species from Sudan in 1866. The specific epithet is derived from Martin Theodor von Heuglin. Three subspecies are recognized: Cossypha heuglini subrufescens ranging from Gabon to western Angola; C. h. heuglini from the southern parts of Chad and Sudan to eastern Angola, Botswana, and northern South Africa; and C. h. intermedia from southern Somalia to northeastern South Africa.

== Description ==
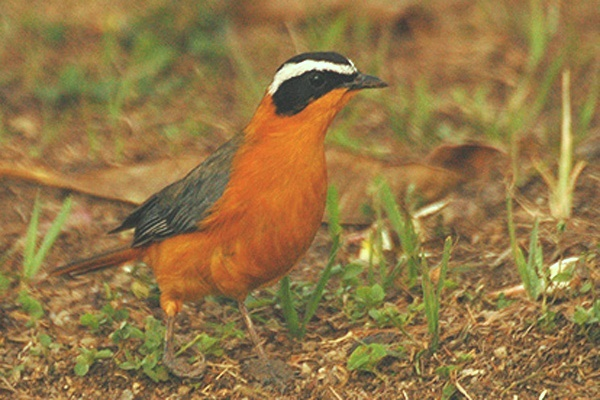
Photographed at Queen Elizabeth NP, Uganda

The white-browed robin-chat is 19–20 cm (7.5–7.9 in) long and weighs 29–51 g (1.0–1.8 oz). The crown and face are black, and there is a white supercilium over the dark brown eye. The back is olive grey-brown, and the rump is rufous. The two central tail feathers are olive-brown, and the other feathers are orange-rufous. The flight feathers and wing coverts are grey-brown, and the underwing coverts are rufous. The underparts are bright orange-rufous. The beak is black, and the legs are pinkish-brown, brownish grey, or dark brown. The female is a little smaller than the male. The juvenile bird has a brown head and rufous-brown marks on its back. Its throat is pale, its breast is pale orange-buff, and its belly is pale orange.

== Distribution and habitat ==
The range includes Angola, Botswana, Burundi, Cameroon, Central African Republic, Chad, Republic of the Congo, Democratic Republic of the Congo, Eswatini, Ethiopia, Gabon, Kenya, Malawi, Mozambique, Namibia, Rwanda, Somalia, South Africa, South Sudan, Sudan, Tanzania, Uganda, Zambia, and Zimbabwe. Its habitats include riverine forests, thickets, and also gardens. In East Africa it can be found up to 2,200 m (7,200 ft) above sea level, but in the part of its range south of the Limpopo River, it generally occurs at elevations below 1,000 m (3,280 ft). In South Africa, its range in KwaZulu-Natal expanded south from the 1950s to the 1970s, but the damage caused by a tropical cyclone in 1987 may have stopped the expansion.

== Behavior and ecology ==
The diet consists of ants, termites, beetles, some other insects and arthropods, frogs, and fruits. It bathes in water.

=== Vocalizations ===
The white-browed robin-chat's contact calls include repeated pit-porlee, chiiritter-porlii and da-da-tee and end with da-teee or chickle-ter-tweep. The alarm call is takata-kata-kata. The melodious song, usually given at dawn and dusk, is quiet at first and then becomes louder; it consists of pip-pip-uree, don't-you-do-it or tirrootirree phrases that can be repeated more than ten times. When singing loudly, its beak is wide open and its breast is inflated with its tail moving with each note sung. Pairs may sing in duet.

=== Breeding ===
Around the Equator, the bird probably breeds in all months of the year, and in East Africa, it breeds during the two wet seasons. In southern Africa, breeding has been recorded from July to May. It is monogamous. There are usually two and sometimes three broods per year. The female builds the nest, which is made of dead leaves, twigs, and other plant material and built in a tree hole, stump, sapling, roots, riverbank, or on the ground. It has been observed nesting near humans, on occupied buildings' walls and trellises covered with climbing plants. There are two to three eggs in a clutch. The nest is often parasitized by the red-chested cuckoo. This robin-chat is territorial and defends its territory by giving alarm calls and sometimes by attacking the intruder.

== Status ==
Cossypha heuglini has a large range and a stable population trend, so the IUCN Red List has assessed it to be of least concern.
