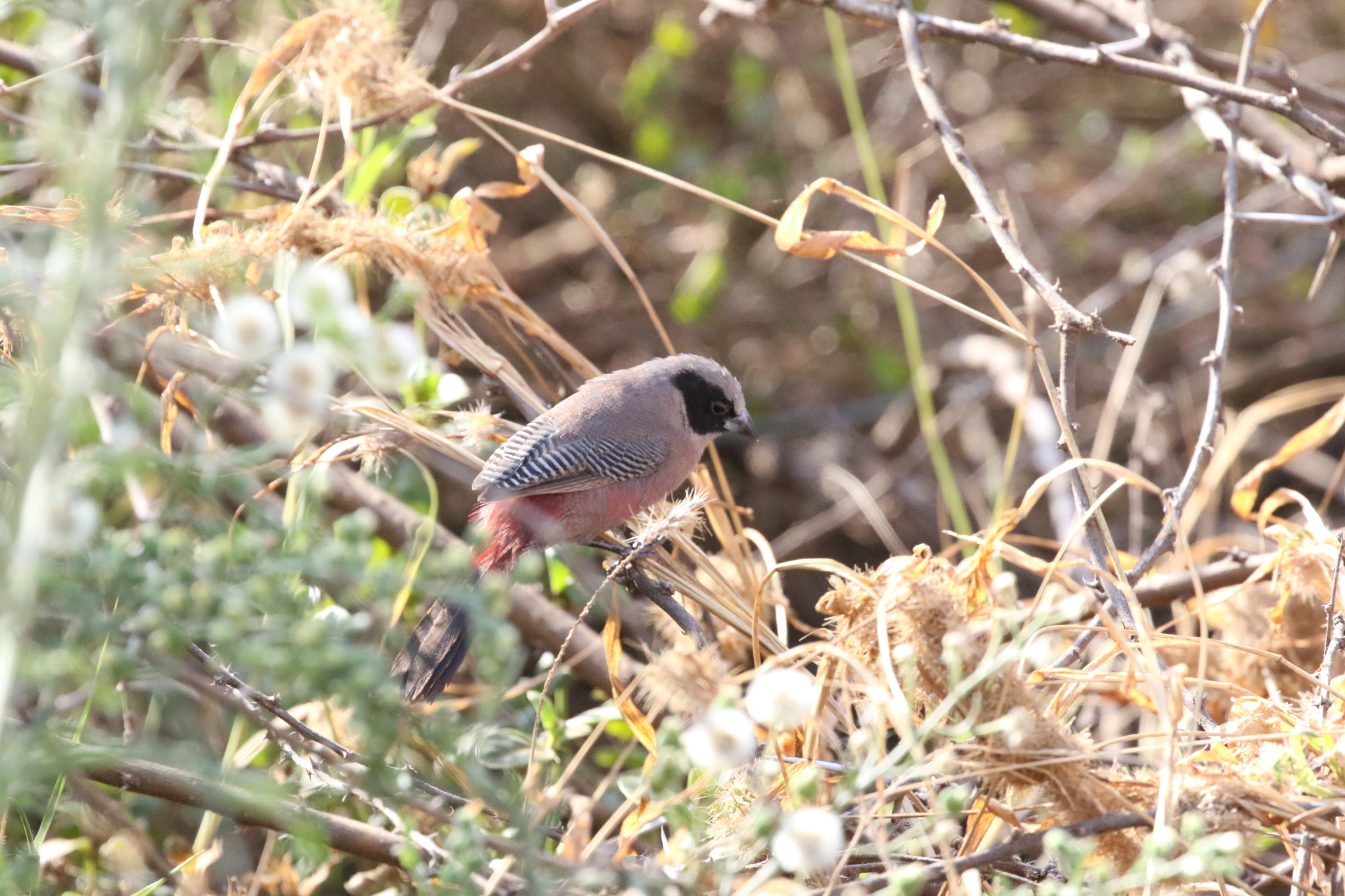
- A black-cheeked waxbill at Loitokitok, Kenya

Conservation status
- Least Concern (IUCN 3.1)

Scientific classification
- Kingdom: Animalia
- Phylum: Chordata
- Class: Aves
- Order: Passeriformes
- Family: Estrildidae
- Genus: Brunhilda
- Species: B. charmosyna

Binomial name
- Brunhilda charmosyna (Reichenow, 1881)

Synonyms
- Estrilda charmosyna

= Black-cheeked waxbill =

Species of bird

The black-cheeked waxbill or red-rumped waxbill (Brunhilda charmosyna) is a common species of estrildid finch found in east Africa. It has an estimated global extent of occurrence of 400,000 km^{2} (150,000 sq mi).

It is found in Ethiopia, Kenya, Somalia, South Sudan and Tanzania. The status of the species is evaluated as Least Concern.

Two subspecies are recognised:

- B. c. charmosyna (Reichenow, 1881) – south Sudan, Ethiopia, south Somalia, northeast Uganda and north Kenya
- B. c. kiwanukae (Van Someren, 1919) – south Kenya and Tanzania
