= List of brood parasitic passerines =

Interspecific brood parasitism evolved twice independently in the order Passeriformes, in the cowbirds (genus Molothrus) and in the family Viduidae. Instead of making nests of their own, and feeding their young, brood parasites deposit their eggs in the nests of other birds.

The vampire ground finch is a parasite, but is not brood parasitic.

== Species ==
Family Viduidae
Common name	Scientific name	Range	Host species (Note: Some primary host species of Vidua are only known from song mimicry)
Cuckoo-finch	Anomalospiza imberbis (Cabanis, 1868)		Cisticolidae, most commonly Prinia subflava
Village indigobird	Vidua chalybeata (Müller, 1776)		Lagonosticta senegala, Lagonosticta nitidula
Jambandu indigobird	Vidua raricola Payne, 1982		Amandava subflava (primary host), possibly Lagonosticta rara
Barka indigobird	Vidua larvaticola Payne, 1982		Lagonosticta larvata (primary host), Lagonosticta virata
Jos Plateau indigobird	Vidua maryae Payne, 1982		Lagonosticta sanguinodorsalis (Note: Suspected from song mimicry)
Quailfinch indigobird	Vidua nigeriae (Alexander, 1908)		Ortygospiza atricollis
Dusky indigobird	Vidua funerea (de Tarragon, L, 1847)		Lagonosticta rubricata
Zambezi indigobird	Vidua codringtoni (Neave, 1907)		Hypargos niveoguttatus (primary host), Hypargos margaritatus
Purple indigobird	Vidua purpurascens (Reichenow, 1883)		Lagonosticta rhodopareia (primary host), possibly Lagonosticta rubricata
Wilson's indigobird	Vidua wilsoni (Hartert, 1901)		Lagonosticta rufopicta (for V. w. wilsoni), Lagonosticta nitidula (for V. w. incognita)
Cameroon indigobird	Vidua camerunensis (Grote, 1922)		Lagonosticta rara (primary host), Lagonosticta rubricata, Clytospiza monteiri and Euschistospiza dybowskii
Steel-blue whydah	Vidua hypocherina Verreaux & Verreaux, 1856		Estrilda erythronotos, Estrilda charmosyna
Straw-tailed whydah	Vidua fischeri (Reichenow, 1882)		Unknown, presumed to be Granatina ianthinogaster
Shaft-tailed whydah	Vidua regia (Linnaeus, 1766)		Granatina granatina (primary host), Sporopipes squamifrons, Prinia flavicans
Pin-tailed whydah	Vidua macroura (Pallas, 1764)		Around 17 species in Estrildidae, Cisticolidae, Fringillidae and Emberizidae
Togo paradise whydah	Vidua togoensis (Grote, 1923)		Presumed to be Pytilia hypogrammica
Exclamatory paradise whydah	Vidua interjecta (Grote, 1922)		Pytilia phoenicoptera (primary host), Pytilia lineata, possibly Pytilia hypogrammica
Long-tailed paradise whydah	Vidua paradisaea		Pytilia melba
Sahel paradise whydah	Vidua orientalis		Pytilia melba citerior (for V. o. aucupum)
Broad-tailed paradise whydah	Vidua obtusa		Pytilia afra

Family Icteridae
Common name	Scientific name	Range	Host species (Note: Only includes species known to rear the parasite's young)
Shiny cowbird	Molothrus bonariensis (Gmelin, JF, 1789)		At least 102 species
Brown-headed cowbird	Molothrus ater (Boddaert, 1783)		At least 174 species
Screaming cowbird	Molothrus rufoaxillaris Cassin, 1866		Most commonly Agelaioides badius, occasionally four other species (Note: Gnorimopsar chopi, Pseudoleistes virescens, Cacicus solitarius, and Machetornis rixosa)
Giant cowbird	Molothrus oryzivorus (Gmelin, JF, 1788)		Corvidae and Icteridae, at least 12 species
Bronzed cowbird	Molothrus aeneus (Wagler, 1829)		At least 48 species
