= Paradise whydah =

Five species of indigobird are known as paradise whydah:

- Togo paradise whydah, Vidua togoensis
- Long-tailed paradise whydah, Vidua interjecta
- Eastern paradise whydah, Vidua paradisaea
- Northern paradise whydah, Vidua orientalis
- Broad-tailed paradise whydah, Vidua obtusa
