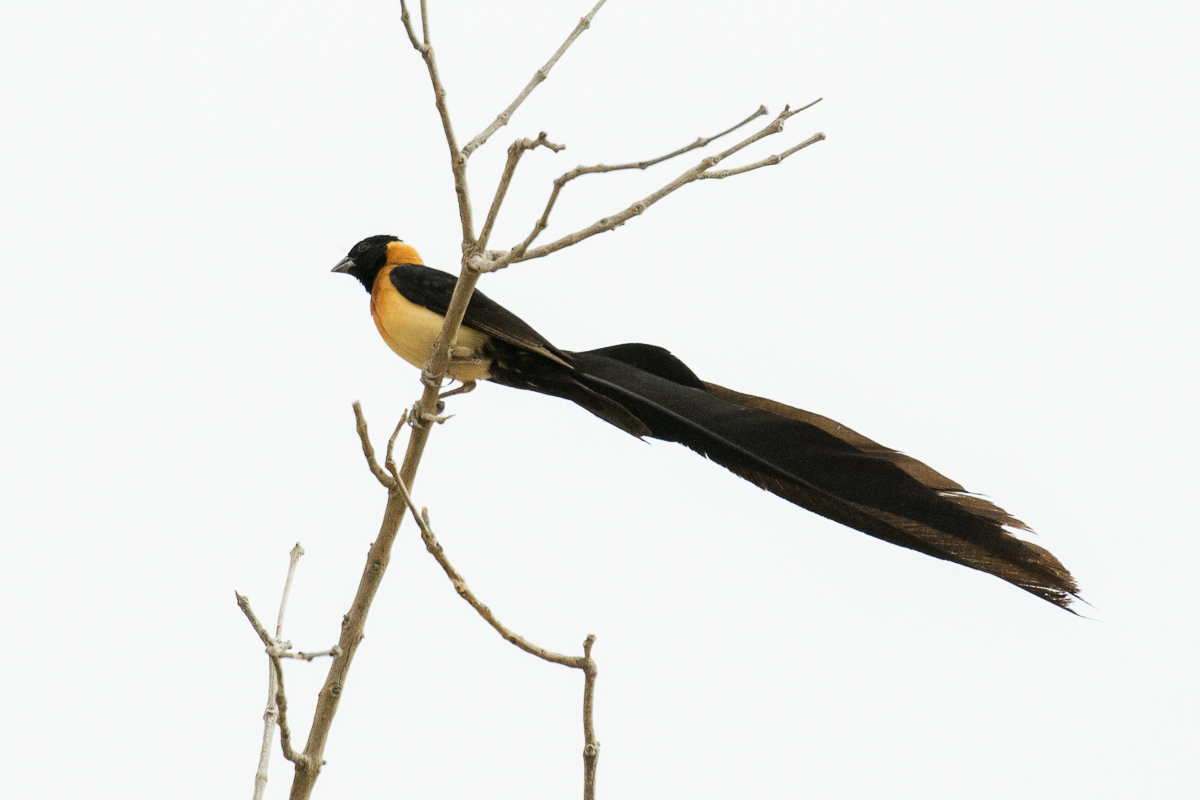
- Adult male in Gambia

Conservation status
- Least Concern (IUCN 3.1)

Scientific classification
- Kingdom: Animalia
- Phylum: Chordata
- Class: Aves
- Order: Passeriformes
- Family: Viduidae
- Genus: Vidua
- Species: V. interjecta

Binomial name
- Vidua interjecta (Grote, 1922)

Synonyms
- Steganura paradisaea interjecta

= Exclamatory paradise whydah =

Species of bird

The exclamatory paradise whydah or Uelle paradise whydah (Vidua interjecta) is a species of bird in the family Viduidae. It is found in the Sudanian savanna region in Benin, Burkina Faso, Cameroon, Central African Republic, Chad, Democratic Republic of the Congo (extreme north only), Ethiopia, Gambia, Ghana, Guinea, Liberia, Mali, Niger, Nigeria, Senegal, South Sudan, and Togo. It was formerly considered conspecific with the related species long-tailed paradise whydah Vidua paradisaea of eastern and southern Africa, being originally described as a subspecies of it.

The females and non-breeding males are 13–14 cm long, while breeding males grow exceptionally long tail feathers extending the bird's full length to 38–40 cm. It differs from the long-tailed paradise whydah in the male having a marginally shorter and broader tail, and an orange-toned nape, rather than buff; and the females having a pink, rather than dark grey, bill. It is also very similar to the Sahel paradise whydah Vidua orientalis (with which it overlaps in range), the males differing from this in the tail being longer; and again the females having a pink, rather than dark grey, bill.
