= Cameroon indigobird =

Conservation status
- Least Concern (IUCN 3.1)

Scientific classification
- Kingdom: Animalia
- Phylum: Chordata
- Class: Aves
- Order: Passeriformes
- Family: Viduidae
- Genus: Vidua
- Species: V. camerunensis

Binomial name
- Vidua camerunensis (Grote, 1922)

Species of bird

The Cameroon indigobird (Vidua camerunensis) is a species of bird in the family Viduidae. It is considered by some authors to be a subspecies of the variable indigobird (Vidua funerea). They range from Sierra Leone to east Cameroon, north east Zaire and South Sudan.

There are less than 10,000 Vidua camerunensis in total, which range over 20,000 km² in the savannah and grasslands of South Africa. The birds have a distinct blue color with underlying brown feathers and a small white beak to crack nuts and seeds. There are many indigobird species in the world, and they are mainly known for their song mimicry. The different species of indigobirds are not morphologically different, but they do differ in the songs they choose to mimic.

== Ecology and behavior ==
Cameroon indigobirds are known for song determination and mimicking the songs of other bird species. The males pick which songs to mimic; however, when one male chooses a song from a host bird, the other males mimic other songs from a different host species. This is an effective way to differentiate males when mimicking the songs. There are several distinct host species that the indigobirds mimic from; the most common are the black-bellied firefinch (Lagonosticta rara) and African firefinch (L. rubricata).

The variation in how indigobirds mimic different songs is based on the host species. Researchers have thought that because different indigobird species sing different songs, they must be reproductively isolated. However, when a paternity test was done between the different species, it was found that the birds were not reproductively isolated. They concluded that indigobirds switch songs among several different hosts, but that this switching does not mean that the species are biologically different. In fact, they are very much related to one another in which they are not isolated from other species. Reproductive isolation cannot be determined just by the shifts of song mimicry from different hosts.

The indigobirds also use song mimicry for sexual and natural selection. Male indigobirds are most territorial and aggressive when they hear their own song or the host song that they mimic. These birds know and recognize which song is the one they mimic, compared to what other species mimic. For natural selection, it is in the bird's favor to mimic another song compared to other species. They save resources because they do not have to fight with others to mark their territory, thus decreasing their aggressiveness. As for sexual selection, females are attracted to males that master the art of mimicry. A female decides to mate with the male who sings the song that is most known to the females. The eggs are laid in another host's nest instead of their own.

Song discrimination is very critical in the young. They learn to sing and mimic songs in their sensitive period. Establishing their mimicry allows for the best fit in natural selection, and for reproduction with sexual selection.

== Brood parasites ==
These birds are obligate brooding parasites, meaning they lay eggs in other birds' nests. The learning of the songs and imprinting is also obligate for them because this is how they increase their fitness. The male have impressive vocal repertoires that can be used to mimic, calling, or mating. DaCosta et al. found evidence that host mimicry is an important cue for species recognition among the territorial male birds. They predict that this could have arisen due to when juveniles transform into adults and they tend to be dispersed. These calls help them recognize and locate other birds of the same species. They also did a study on how different mimicry can elicit different responses in these birds. In the experimental group, the scientists recorded these calls and played them to the captive birds. In the control group, they sounded natural calls for the captive birds. They found that birds tended to respond differently to the audio recording compared to natural singing.

Scientists have tested whether female indigobirds have a preference as to what type of songs the male indigobird sings. They found that females choose males that have the closest song that matched the foster parent's songs. For example, if the female was going to lay an egg in the Bengalese finches, she would want a mate that would mimic the song of these Bengalese finches. This is also not due to innate bias for songs, as they prefer songs that improve their fitness and survival.

Most of how species are named is based on the biological species concept, so it is a critical role to know which species of birds these were breeding. Imprinting and sexual courtships are very important in these types of birds, as they need to behave a certain way to lay their eggs. The males of these indigobirds courted heterospecific females to increase genetic diversity. These males know that to increase fitness, they need to mate with females who have the highest genetic diversity to pass on to the offspring. Due to this, there has been molecular analysis done on these birds to show the clades of the phylogenetic tree. The scientists did the analysis on all the birds that were similar to multiple host colonizations. They each contributed to interbreeding populations that acquired the singing from these host species. They hypothesized that interbreeding is relevant in these birds because they mate with several species, so it is hard to distinctly specify species of one clade.

In the creation of the phylogenetic tree, they found that African brood parasitic finches are actually the host specialists that mimic the songs and nestling of their finch hosts. These birds also have high rates of cospeciation, as many of these birds interbreed with one another. Host switches have also been involved in the creation of new hosts with the close or same related genus, which would be apparent for congruence of the hosts and the parasitic birds.
