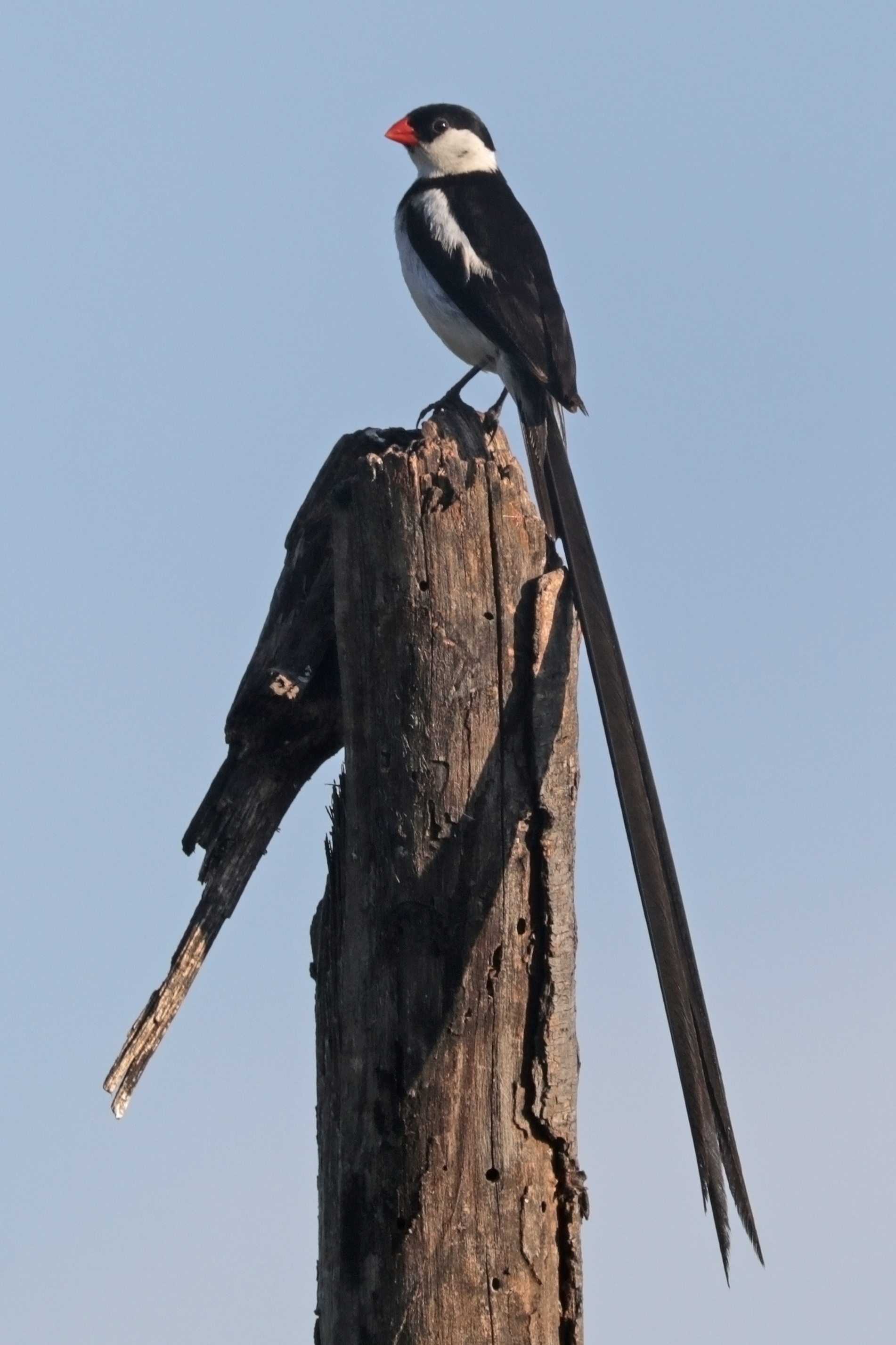
- Male pin-tailed whydah (Vidua macroura)

Scientific classification
- Kingdom: Animalia
- Phylum: Chordata
- Class: Aves
- Order: Passeriformes
- Family: Viduidae
- Genus: Vidua; Cuvier, 1816

Type species
- Emberiza vidua = Fringilla macroura Linnaeus, 1766

Species
- see text

= Vidua =

Genus of birds in the family Viduidae

Vidua is a genus of passerine birds in the family Viduidae.

The genus was introduced by the French naturalist Georges Cuvier in 1816. The type species was subsequently designated as the pin-tailed whydah. The name Vidua is a Latin word meaning "widow".

The genus contains the following 19 species:

Image	Scientific name	Common name	Distribution
	Vidua chalybeata	Village indigobird	Africa south of the Sahara Desert.
	Vidua purpurascens	Purple indigobird	Angola, Botswana, Democratic Republic of the Congo, Kenya, Malawi, Mozambique, South Africa, Tanzania, Zambia, and Zimbabwe.
	Vidua raricola	Jambandu indigobird	Benin, Burkina Faso, Cameroon, Central African Republic, Ghana, Guinea, Ivory Coast, Liberia, Nigeria, Sierra Leone, South Sudan and Togo.
	Vidua larvaticola	Barka indigobird	Cameroon, Ethiopia, Gambia, Ghana, Guinea, Nigeria, Sudan, and South Sudan.
	Vidua funerea	Dusky indigobird	Angola, Burundi, Cameroon, Republic of the Congo, Democratic Republic of the Congo, Eswatini, Guinea-Bissau, Malawi, Mozambique, Nigeria, Sierra Leone, South Africa, Tanzania, Zambia, and Zimbabwe
	Vidua codringtoni	Zambezi indigobird	Malawi, Tanzania, Zambia, and Zimbabwe.
	Vidua wilsoni	Wilson's indigobird	Cameroon, Central African Republic, Chad, Republic of the Congo, Democratic Republic of the Congo, Ivory Coast, Ghana, Guinea, Guinea-Bissau, Nigeria, Senegal, South Sudan, and Togo.
	Vidua nigeriae	Quailfinch indigobird	The Gambia, Nigeria and Cameroon.
	Vidua maryae	Jos Plateau indigobird	Nigeria
	Vidua camerunensis	Cameroon indigobird	Sierra Leone to east Cameroon, north east Zaire and South Sudan.
	Vidua macroura	Pin-tailed whydah	Africa south of the Sahara Desert.
	Vidua hypocherina	Steel-blue whydah	Ethiopia, Kenya, Somalia, South Sudan, Tanzania, and Uganda.
	Vidua fischeri	Straw-tailed whydah	Ethiopia, Kenya, Somalia, South Sudan, Tanzania, and Uganda.
	Vidua regia	Shaft-tailed whydah	Southern Africa, from south Angola to south Mozambique
	Vidua paradisaea	Long-tailed paradise whydah	Eastern Africa, from eastern South Sudan to southern Angola
	Vidua orientalis	Sahel paradise whydah	west Africa
	Vidua interjecta	Exclamatory paradise whydah	Benin, Cameroon, Central African Republic, Chad, Democratic Republic of the Congo, Ethiopia, Ghana, Guinea, Liberia, Mali, Nigeria, Sudan, and Togo.
	Vidua togoensis	Togo paradise whydah	Benin, Cameroon, Chad, Ivory Coast, Ghana, Mali, Sierra Leone, and Togo.
	Vidua obtusa	Broad-tailed paradise whydah	Angola, Botswana, Burundi, Democratic Republic of the Congo, Kenya, Malawi, Mozambique, Namibia, Rwanda, South Africa, Tanzania, Uganda, Zambia, and Zimbabwe

Members of this genus brood-parasitise estrilid finches. Estrildidae is the sister family to Viduidae.
