= Quailfinch indigobird =

Conservation status
- Least Concern (IUCN 3.1)

Scientific classification
- Kingdom: Animalia
- Phylum: Chordata
- Class: Aves
- Order: Passeriformes
- Family: Viduidae
- Genus: Vidua
- Species: V. nigeriae

Binomial name
- Vidua nigeriae (Alexander, 1908)

Species of bird

The quailfinch indigobird (Vidua nigeriae) is a small songbird. It is a resident breeding bird in The Gambia, Nigeria and Cameroon. It occurs in isolated localities, especially on river flood plains.

It was formerly considered to be a subspecies of the variable indigobird, Vidua funerea.

It is a brood parasite which lays its eggs in the nest of the African quailfinch, Ortygospiza atricollis, a slightly unusual host since it is only a distant relative to the firefinches parasitised by most indigobirds. It does not destroy the host's egg, but its own eggs are added to those already present.

The adult male quailfinch indigobird has greenish-black plumage, and the female resembles a female house sparrow, with streaked brown upperparts, buff underparts and a whitish supercilium.

Many of the indigobirds are very similar in appearance, with the males difficult to separate in the field, and the young and females near impossible. A helpful pointer is the association with the host species, the quailfinch.

The diet of this species consists of seeds and grain.
