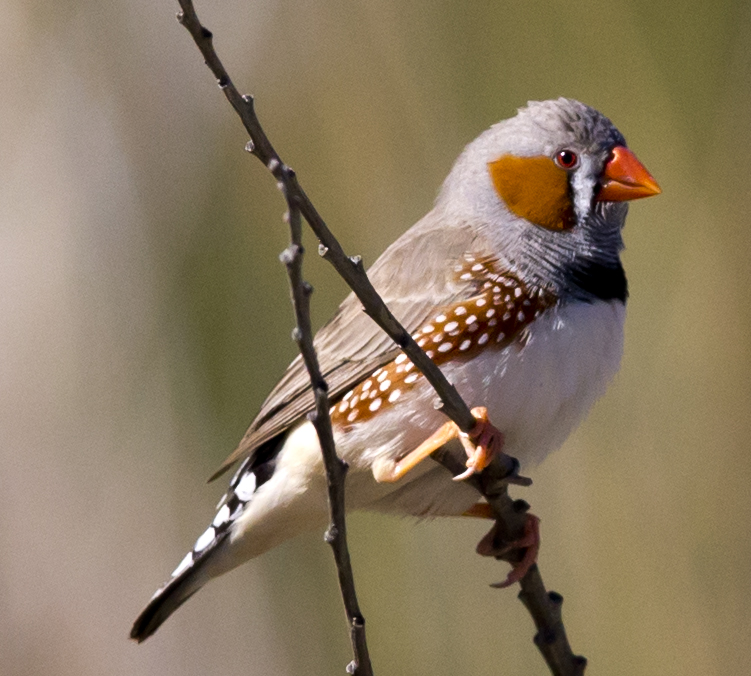
- A male Australian zebra finch

Scientific classification
- Kingdom: Animalia
- Phylum: Chordata
- Class: Aves
- Order: Passeriformes
- Suborder: Passeri
- Infraorder: Passerides
- Parvorder: Passerida
- Superfamily: Ploceoidea

Families
- Ploceidae; Viduidae; Estrildidae

= Ploceoidea =

Superfamily of birds

Ploceoidea is a superfamily of birds of the Passeriformes.

== Systematics ==
Ploceoidea contains the following families:

- Ploceidae
- Viduidae
- Estrildidae
