= Jos Plateau indigobird =

Conservation status
- Least Concern (IUCN 3.1)

Scientific classification
- Kingdom: Animalia
- Phylum: Chordata
- Class: Aves
- Order: Passeriformes
- Family: Viduidae
- Genus: Vidua
- Species: V. maryae

Binomial name
- Vidua maryae Payne, 1982
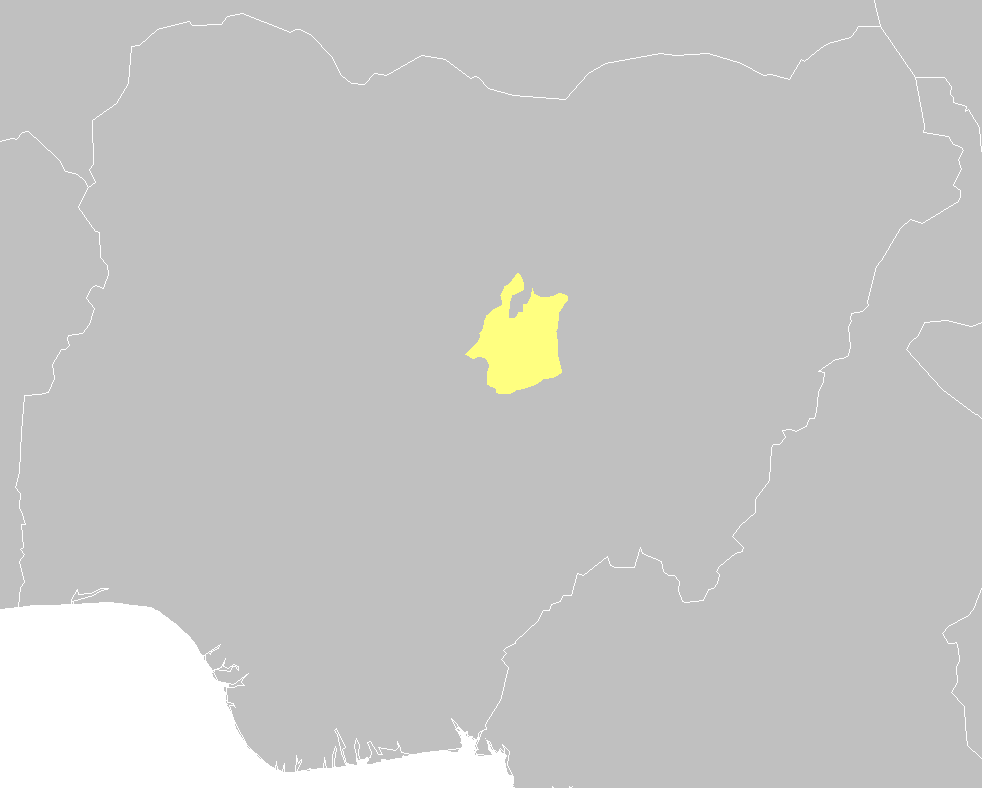
- Location of the Jos Plateau within Nigeria

Species of bird

The Jos Plateau indigobird (Vidua maryae) is a species of bird in the family Viduidae. It was thought to be endemic to Nigeria, but has been recently reported from northern Cameroon. It lays its eggs in the nest of the rock firefinch which is also restricted to Nigeria. Because of their inability to incubate their eggs, they lay their eggs in the nest of the rock firefinch and then take away the exact number of laid eggs from the host bird in order to avoid suspicion from the host bird . After hatching they exhibit dominance against the hatchlings of the rock firefinches. Their breeding seasons are all round the year but more pronounced during the cold Harmattan period between July and December.

Its natural habitats are dry woodland and shrubland in rocky areas. It is threatened by habitat loss.
