= Jambandu indigobird =

Conservation status
- Least Concern (IUCN 3.1)

Scientific classification
- Kingdom: Animalia
- Phylum: Chordata
- Class: Aves
- Order: Passeriformes
- Family: Viduidae
- Genus: Vidua
- Species: V. raricola

Binomial name
- Vidua raricola Payne, 1982

Species of bird

The jambandu indigobird (Vidua raricola) is a species of bird in the family Viduidae. It is also known as the goldbreast indigobird. It is found in Benin, Burkina Faso, Cameroon, Central African Republic, Ghana, Guinea, Ivory Coast, Liberia, Nigeria, Sierra Leone, South Sudan and Togo. Its habitat is savannah and brush.
