= Barka indigobird =

Conservation status
- Least Concern (IUCN 3.1)

Scientific classification
- Kingdom: Animalia
- Phylum: Chordata
- Class: Aves
- Order: Passeriformes
- Family: Viduidae
- Genus: Vidua
- Species: V. larvaticola

Binomial name
- Vidua larvaticola Payne, 1982

Species of bird

The barka indigobird (Vidua larvaticola) is a species of bird in the family Viduidae. It is found in Cameroon, Ethiopia, Gambia, Ghana, Guinea, Nigeria, Sudan, and South Sudan. It is also known as the baka indigobird but the spelling "barka" is more correct; the word is a greeting in the Hausa language.
