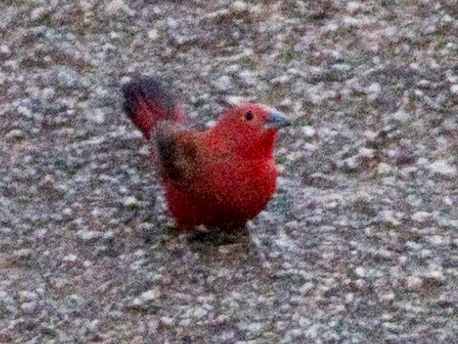

Conservation status
- Least Concern (IUCN 3.1)

Scientific classification
- Kingdom: Animalia
- Phylum: Chordata
- Class: Aves
- Order: Passeriformes
- Family: Estrildidae
- Genus: Lagonosticta
- Species: L. sanguinodorsalis

Binomial name
- Lagonosticta sanguinodorsalis Payne, 1998
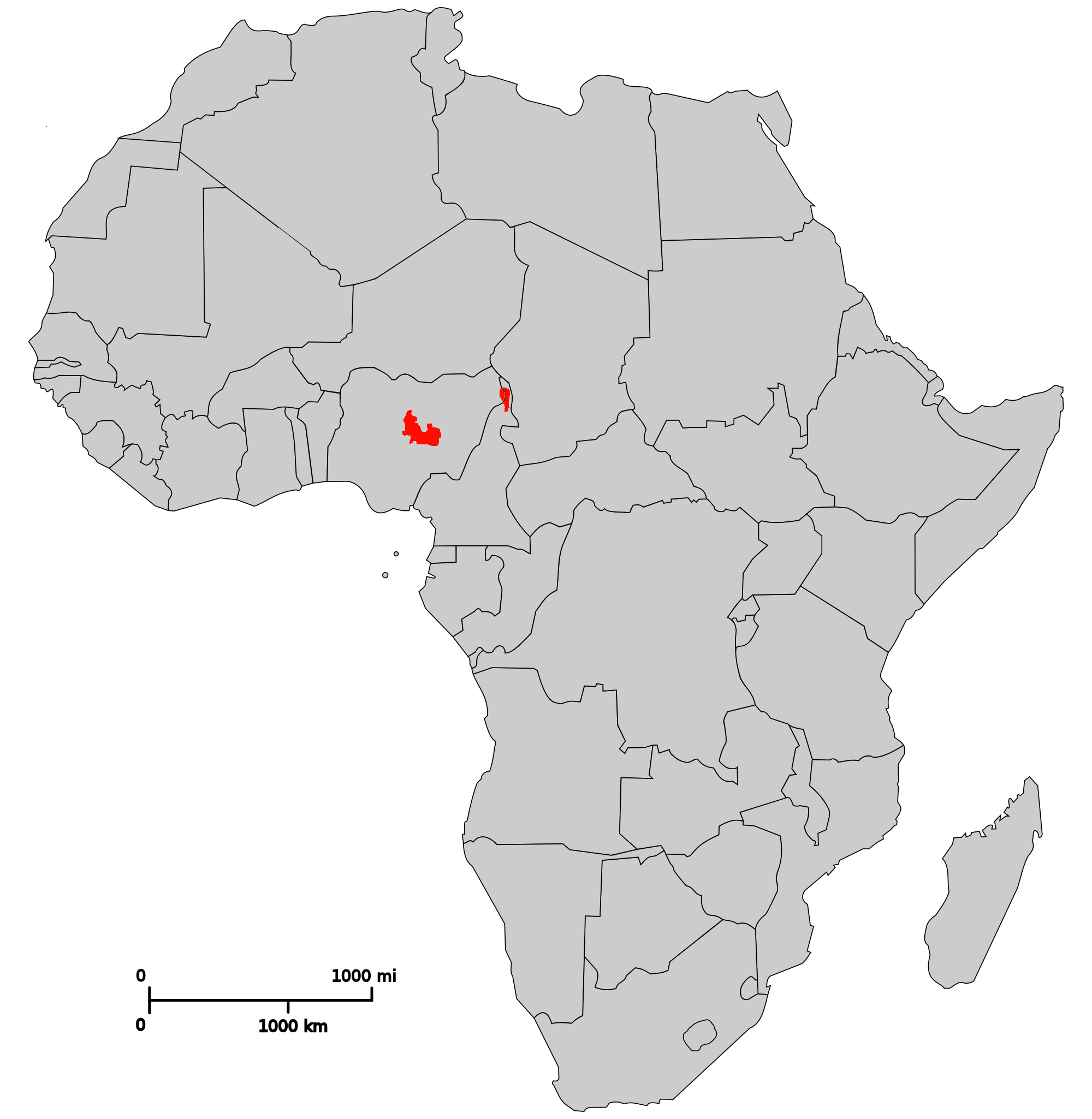
- Range map of rock firefinches

= Rock firefinch =

Species of bird

The rock firefinch (Lagonosticta sanguinodorsalis) is a species of estrildid finch found in the Jos Plateau of central Nigeria and in Cameroon. It has an estimated global extent of occurrence of 29,000 km^{2} (11,000 sq mi). The rock firefinch was discovered recently, in 1998. Rock firefinches fall in the family Estrildidae, which contains small passerine birds of the Old World and Australasia. Rock firefinches seem to be most closely related to Mali firefinches and Chad firefinches. The species name sanguinodorsalis means blood-red back, which was chosen because it describes the vibrant red back color of the male plumage. The status of the species is evaluated as Least Concern.

== Description ==
Rock firefinches are sexually dimorphic, where adult males have more brightly colored plumage than adult females. Males are characterized by a bright red back and a deep red face, throat, breast, and belly. Females are characterized by a reddish-brown back, brownish-gray face, and a greyish-red throat, breast, and belly. A bluish-grey bill is one of the most important defining traits of all rock firefinches. Both males and females have a brownish-grey crown, brownish-red upper wing coverts, deep red rump and upper tail coverts, and white-spotted dark grey flanks and under wing coverts. The wings are dark reddish-brown and the tail is black with red edges on the outer rectrices. Rock firefinches have broad primaries and average wing length of 54 mm (2.1 in). Juvenile rock firefinches are characterized by a paler greyish-brown face and crown and a less red overall plumage compared to adults. Compared to other male firefinches, male rock firefinches have brighter red backs, brownish-grey crowns, and broader primaries that do not have a narrow tip. Compared to other female and juvenile firefinches, female and juvenile rock firefinches have a darker and more reddish overall plumage. Moulting usually coincides with the dry season but can extend into the beginning of the rainy season. Rock firefinches have a variety of distinctive vocalizations. Many of the rock firefinch vocalizations are mimicked by another Jos Plateau bird, called the Vidua maryae, or Jos Plateau indigobird. The Jos Plateau indigobird is a brood parasite of rock firefinches and most likely mimics their songs in order to optimize the success of parasitizing the rock firefinches.

== Distribution and habitat ==
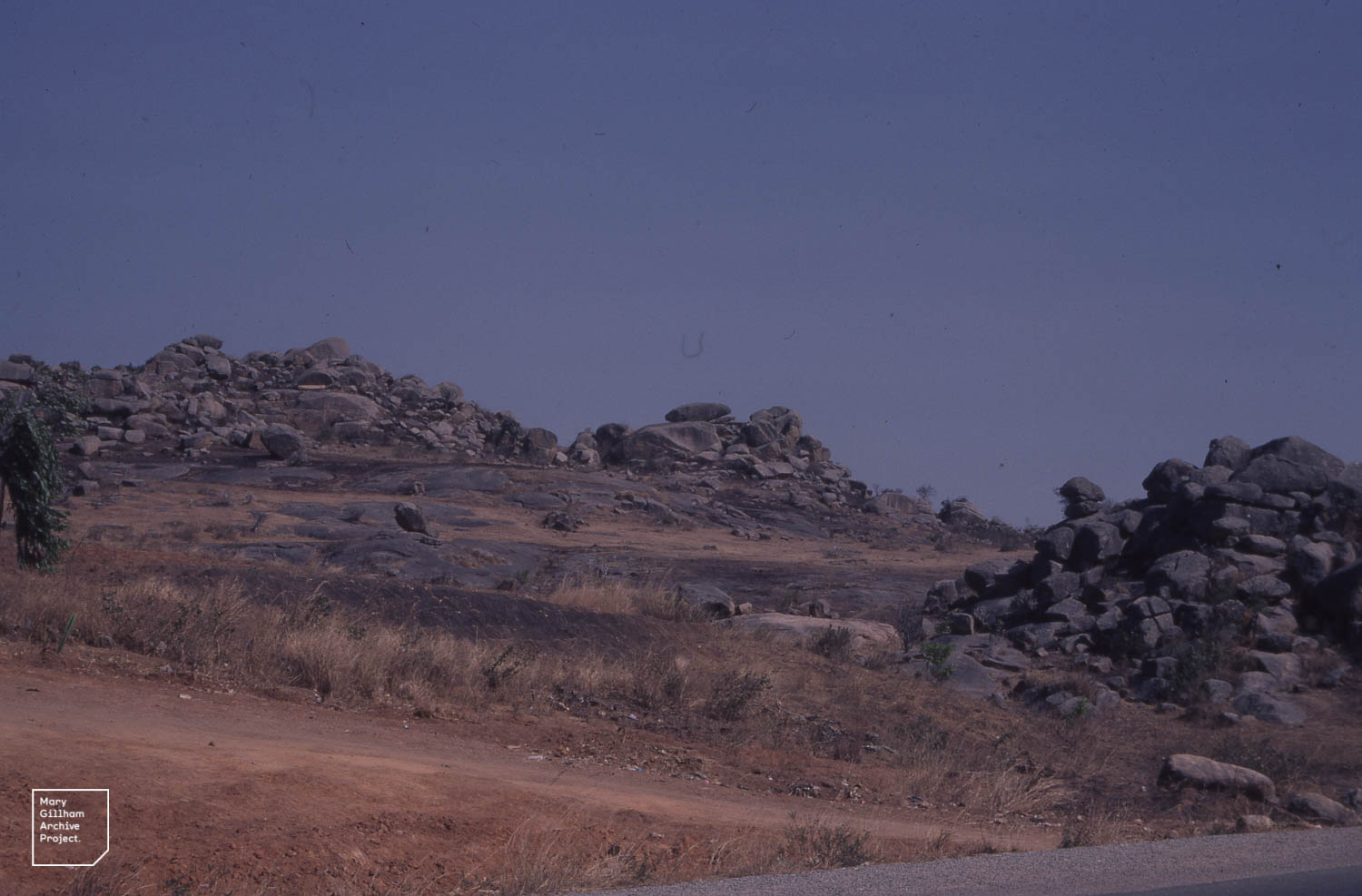
Rocky Inselbergs: typical habitat of rock firefinches

It was first believed that rock firefinches were only endemic to the Jos Plateau in central Nigeria, but observations were also reported in northern Cameroon, which borders eastern Nigeria. Rock firefinches are considered to be range-restricted, since they are mostly found in the Jos Plateau. The Jos Plateau is a rocky habitat with a semi-temperate climate with temperatures ranging from 60 to 80 degrees Fahrenheit. There is a distinct dry season from November to April and rainy season from May to October. Rock firefinches prefer inselbergs in bush savannah habitats and rocky outputs to build their nests in. Inselbergs are isolated hills or mountains that arise from a flat plain. Regardless of the season, rock firefinches live in inselbergs and avoid farmland areas. Rock firefinches have high site fidelity, habitually returning to the same area throughout the whole year. During the dry season, rock firefinches have larger home ranges as a result of traveling to gallery forests to attain water. During the wet season, rock firefinches do not need to travel to distant water resources and therefore have a smaller home range.

== Behavior and ecology ==
=== Breeding ===
Rock firefinches are monogamous, keeping their breeding partner for life. Breeding season begins at the end of rainy season when rainfall starts to decrease. The average clutch size for rock firefinches is 3 eggs. Rock firefinch nests have a high predation rate at approximately 50%. However, they are able to make a second breeding attempt if the first one fails. Both male and female rock firefinches contribute to incubating the eggs. While one of the partners incubates the eggs, the other usually leaves to watch over the nest from a distance. However, only the female attends to the nest during the night. This is most likely because only the females have a brood patch, which helps transfer heat to the eggs when the temperatures drop at night. The average incubation period before hatching is 14 days. The chicks are semi-precocial and fledge the nest a few days after hatching. Rock firefinches are brood parasitized by Jos Plateau indigobirds. The indigobirds will lay their eggs in the rock firefinches' nests, leaving their offspring to be reared by the rock firefinches. This reduces the reproductive success of the rock firefinches, as they are using their resources to raise other species' young. Rock firefinch populations that are located geographically near each other in the Jos Plateau are somewhat isolated, and therefore these populations are affected by genetic drift and inbreeding. Due to a high predation rate and brood parasitism, rock firefinches have a low breeding output compared to other subtropical birds.

=== Food and feeding ===
Rock firefinches are tropical granivorous birds, eating mostly seeds on the ground for their diet. Their long bill shape allows them to efficiently extract seeds from the sandy ground of the Jos Plateau. They tend to forage in pairs in places with more vegetation and less bare ground. Rock firefinches have a bimodal foraging pattern regardless of whether there is a predation risk present. Their foraging patterns instead largely correlate with diurnal temperature variation, suggesting that this is the driving force for their feeding behavior. Most of the rock firefinches' feeding occurs in the cool morning hours and then again midday when the temperatures drop. This could be due to an effort to reduce water loss by warmer temperatures, which would be more resource efficient for rock firefinches in the Jos Plateau. The costs of thermoregulation and water loss therefore outweigh the predation risk of rock firefinches, and thus their foraging behaviors are driven more by temperature variation than by the risk of predation. This differs from many other free-living birds who forage relatively constantly throughout the day, with the risk of starvation being the main driving factor for their foraging patterns. Rock firefinches are dominant over another species of estrildid finches of the area, L. senegala, and therefore exclude them from abundant food patches.

=== Threats ===
Although Jos Plateau indigobirds are not predators of rock firefinches, they do negatively affect the firefinches' overall fitness due to their acts of brood parasitism. The indigobirds' nestling mimicry gives them an advantage over the rock firefinches, and so the rock firefinches are tricked into caring for another species' young. This requires a larger energy expenditure by the rock firefinches, which decreases their survival and reproductive success. Rock firefinches have a relatively low annual adult survival rate of 0.656, compared other African firefinch survival rates which average 0.845. Another threat to rock firefinch survival is due to anthropogenic effects. Habitat degradation is occurring at an alarming rate in Nigeria due to intensive wood-cutting and encroaching farmland to be used for domestic and commercial purposes. These anthropogenic acts are destroying rock firefinch nests and foraging grounds, therefore threatening their survival. Habitat fragmentation is reducing population size and by default, reducing the amount of gene flow between rock firefinch populations. When genetic diversity is lost between populations, rock firefinches are less able to evolve and adapt to the changing environments around them. Continued anthropogenic disruption of rock firefinch habitat has the possibility to divide this species into isolated populations, which could have a devastating effect on the species overall.

== Relationship to humans ==
Rock firefinches actively avoid farmland and already have a low adult survival rate, and therefore may be threatened by continued human disturbance. As the human population of Nigeria continues to grow, there is an increased risk of habitat destruction and therefore depletion of rock firefinch populations if conservation efforts are not put into place.

== Status ==
The International Union for Conservation of Nature (IUCN) classifies rock firefinches as a species of least concern. However, this status could change to "Near Threatened" if continued habitat destruction occurs in the Jos Plateau.
