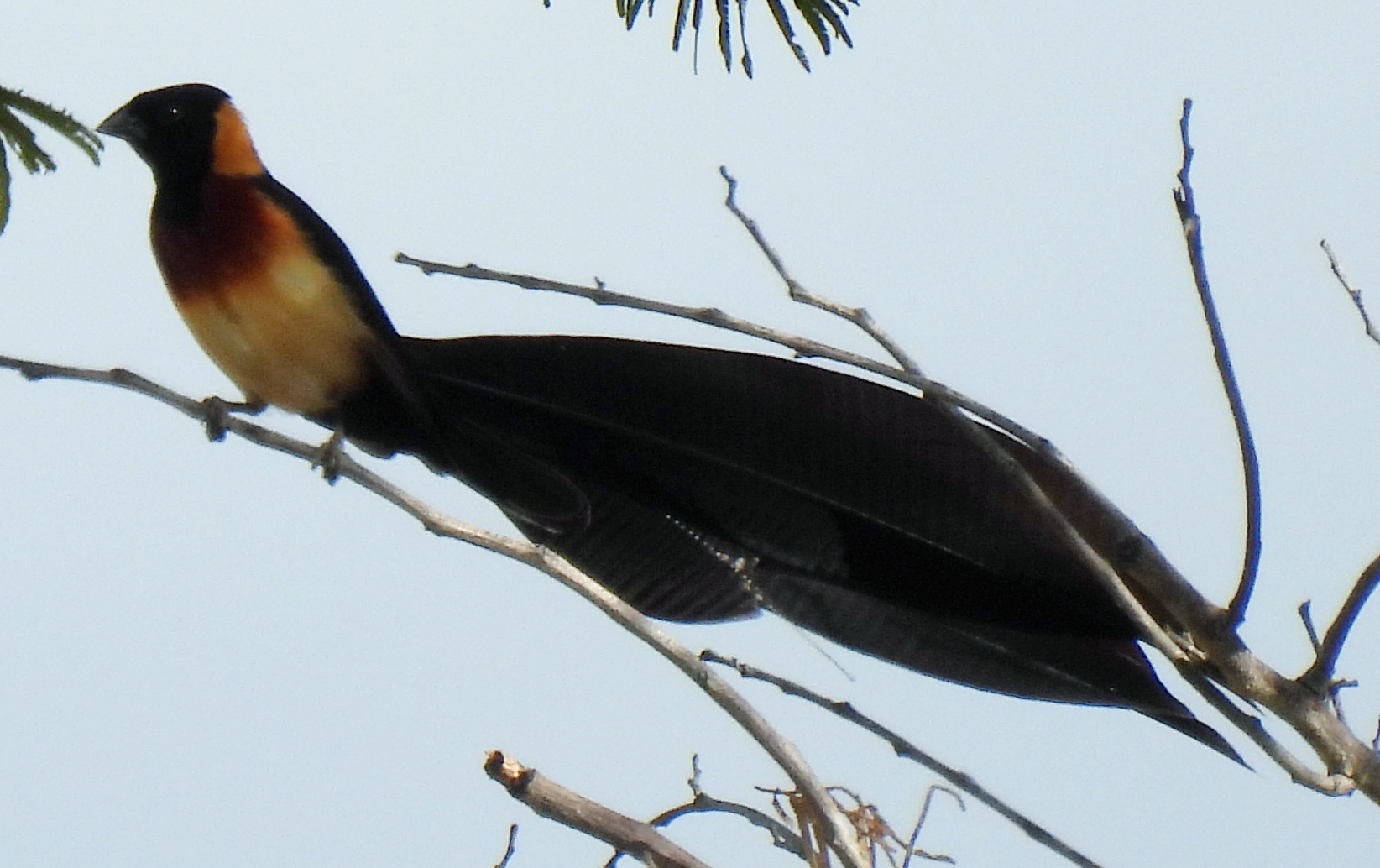
- Male in breeding plumage
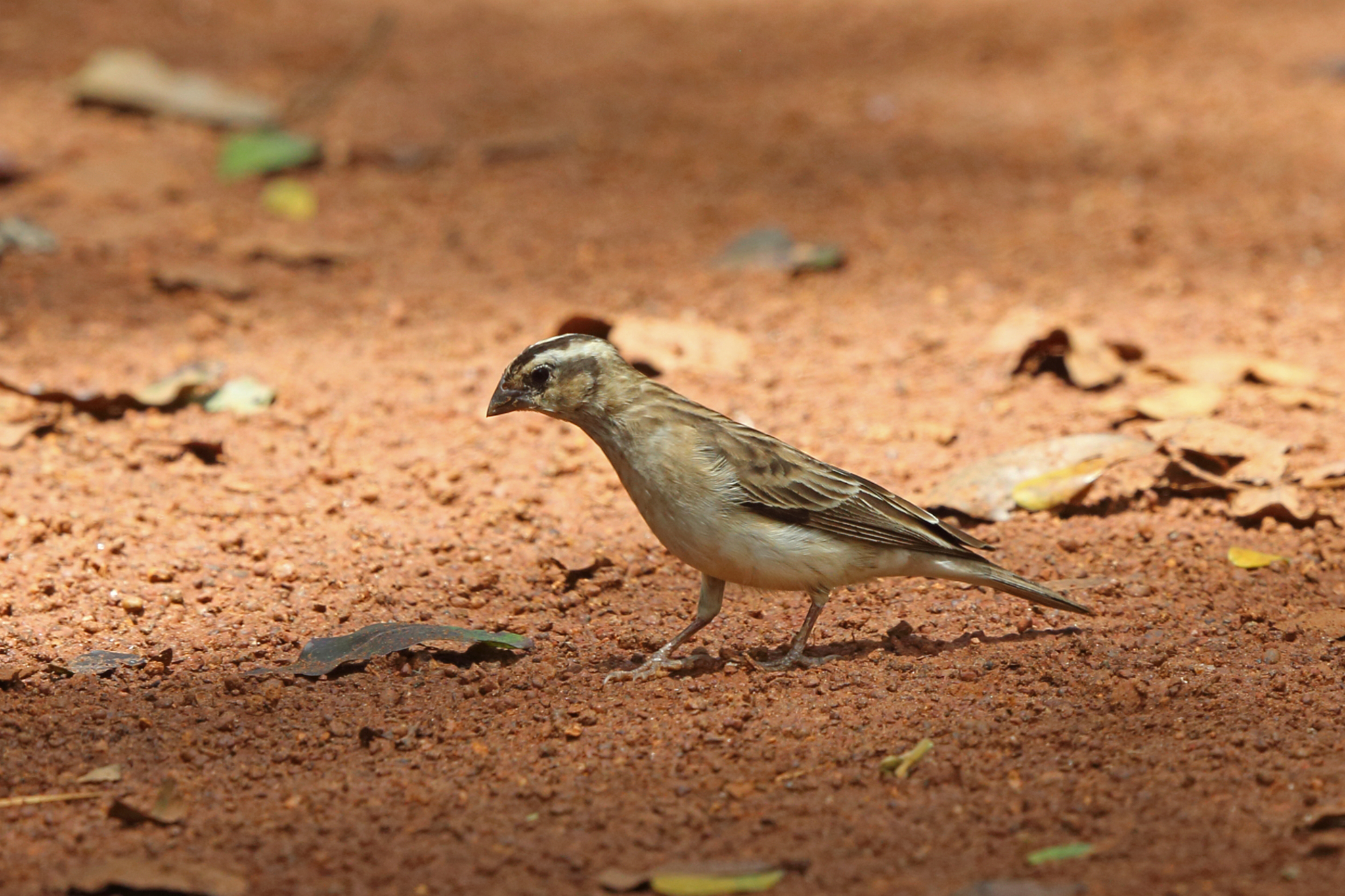
- Female

Conservation status
- Least Concern (IUCN 3.1)

Scientific classification
- Kingdom: Animalia
- Phylum: Chordata
- Class: Aves
- Order: Passeriformes
- Family: Viduidae
- Genus: Vidua
- Species: V. obtusa

Binomial name
- Vidua obtusa (Chapin, 1922)

Synonyms
- Steganura aucupum obtusa

= Broad-tailed paradise whydah =

Species of bird

The broad-tailed paradise whydah (Vidua obtusa) is a species of bird in the family Viduidae. It is found in woodland and acacia savanna habitat in Sub-Saharan Africa from Angola to Uganda, Tanzania and Mozambique. A brood parasite, it has a wide range and the International Union for Conservation of Nature has assessed it as being of least concern.

== Taxonomy ==
Chapin described the broad-tailed paradise whydah as Steganura aucupum obtusa from Luchenza in 1922. Previously, Vidua obtusa, V. interjecta, V. orientalis, V. paradisaea and V. togoensis were considered to be in the same species, and these five species are sometimes placed in the genus Steganura. The broad-tailed paradise whydah is a monotypic species.

== Description ==
The breeding male is 31–36 cm (12–14 in) long, and the nonbreeding male and the female are 14–15 cm (5.5–5.9 in) long. Females have been measured to weigh approximately 19.5 g (0.69 oz). The breeding male has long, broad tail feathers with bluntly pointed to rounded tips; it is distinguished from the related long-tailed paradise whydah in the tail feathers being broader and not quite so long, and in the nape being orange-brown toned rather than paler buff. It has a chestnut-orange patch on its nape. The nonbreeding male's underparts are buffy, and its upperparts are grey-brown, with streaks. There are black and white stripes on its head. The female is similar to the nonbreeding male. The immature bird resembles the female, but some of its feathers have buffy edges, and its patterns are less distinct.

== Distribution and habitat ==
This whydah is found in Angola, Botswana, Burundi, Democratic Republic of the Congo, Kenya, Malawi, Mozambique, Namibia, Rwanda, South Africa, Tanzania, Uganda, Zambia, and Zimbabwe, with an estimated distribution size of 5,060,000 km^{2} (1,950,000 sq mi). Approximately half of the range overlaps with the range of the long-tailed paradise whydah. The broad-tailed paradise whydah's habitat is woodlands, including miombo and Baikiaea plurijuga woodland, and also acacia savannas.

== Behaviour and ecology ==
The broad-tailed paradise whydah is a brood parasite, its host being the orange-winged pytilia (Pytilia afra). The host species only weighs 14–15 g (0.49–0.53 oz) and is thus at a disadvantage. It mimics the host species's call. It feeds on the ground in small flocks, eating seeds. When the broad-tailed paradise whydah is not breeding, it may mix with the long-tailed paradise whydah. Breeding plumage has been observed from February to July in the southeastern Congo Basin. The eggs are white, weighing approximately 1.6 g (0.056 oz). Newborn chicks have loose greyish down, very similar to chicks of the orange-winged pytilia. The incubation period and nestling period are unknown. Irruptions can occur; in 1994, an "invasion" of thousands of whydahs was reported in Kasane, Botswana.

== Status ==
The species has a large range and a stable population trend, so the IUCN Red List has assessed the species as least concern.
