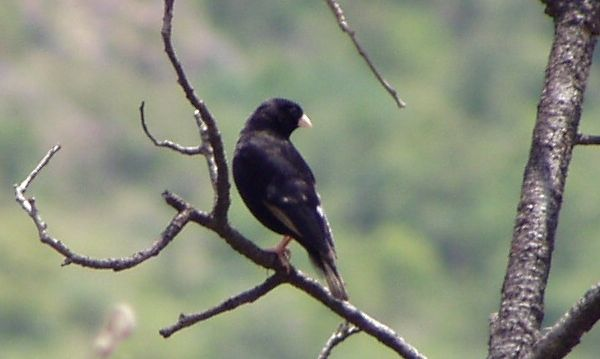
- Male photographed at Mabilingwe Resort, Limpopo Province, South Africa

Conservation status
- Least Concern (IUCN 3.1)

Scientific classification
- Kingdom: Animalia
- Phylum: Chordata
- Class: Aves
- Order: Passeriformes
- Family: Viduidae
- Genus: Vidua
- Species: V. purpurascens

Binomial name
- Vidua purpurascens (Reichenow, 1883)

= Purple indigobird =

Species of bird

The purple indigobird (Vidua purpurascens) is a species of bird in the family Viduidae. It is a brood parasite and parasitizes (lays its eggs in the nest of) Jameson's Firefinch (Lagonosticta rhodopareia). It is also known as the dusky indigobird, a name which can refer to Vidua funerea. It is found in Angola, Botswana, Democratic Republic of the Congo, Kenya, Malawi, Mozambique, South Africa, Tanzania, Zambia, and Zimbabwe. Its natural habitat is dry savanna.
