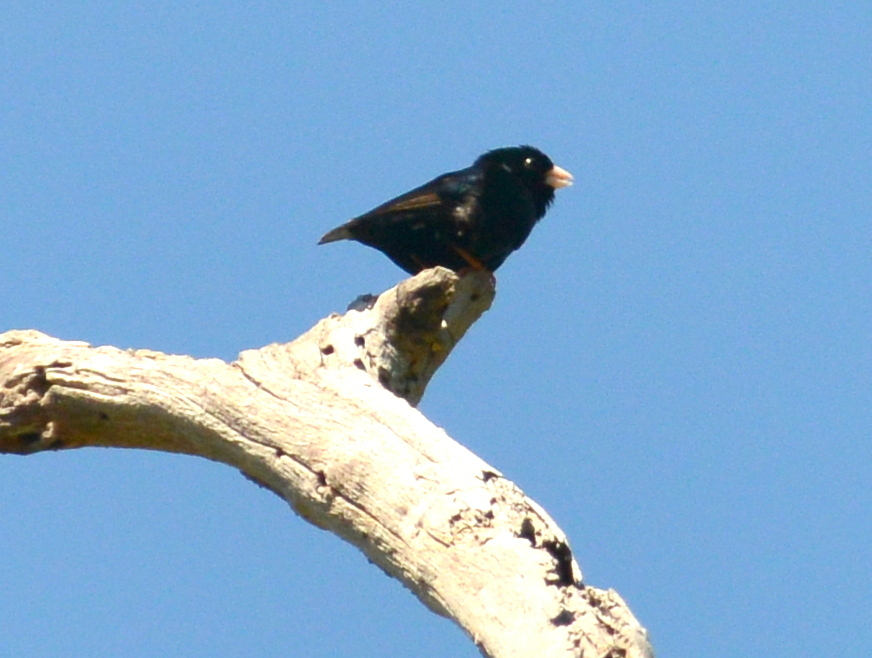

Conservation status
- Least Concern (IUCN 3.1)

Scientific classification
- Kingdom: Animalia
- Phylum: Chordata
- Class: Aves
- Order: Passeriformes
- Family: Viduidae
- Genus: Vidua
- Species: V. codringtoni

Binomial name
- Vidua codringtoni (Neave, 1907)

= Zambezi indigobird =

Species of bird

The Zambezi indigobird (Vidua codringtoni), also known as the twinspot indigobird or green indigobird, is a species of bird in the family Viduidae. It is found in Malawi, Tanzania, Zambia, and Zimbabwe.

It appears on Zambia's new 5 ngwee coin.
