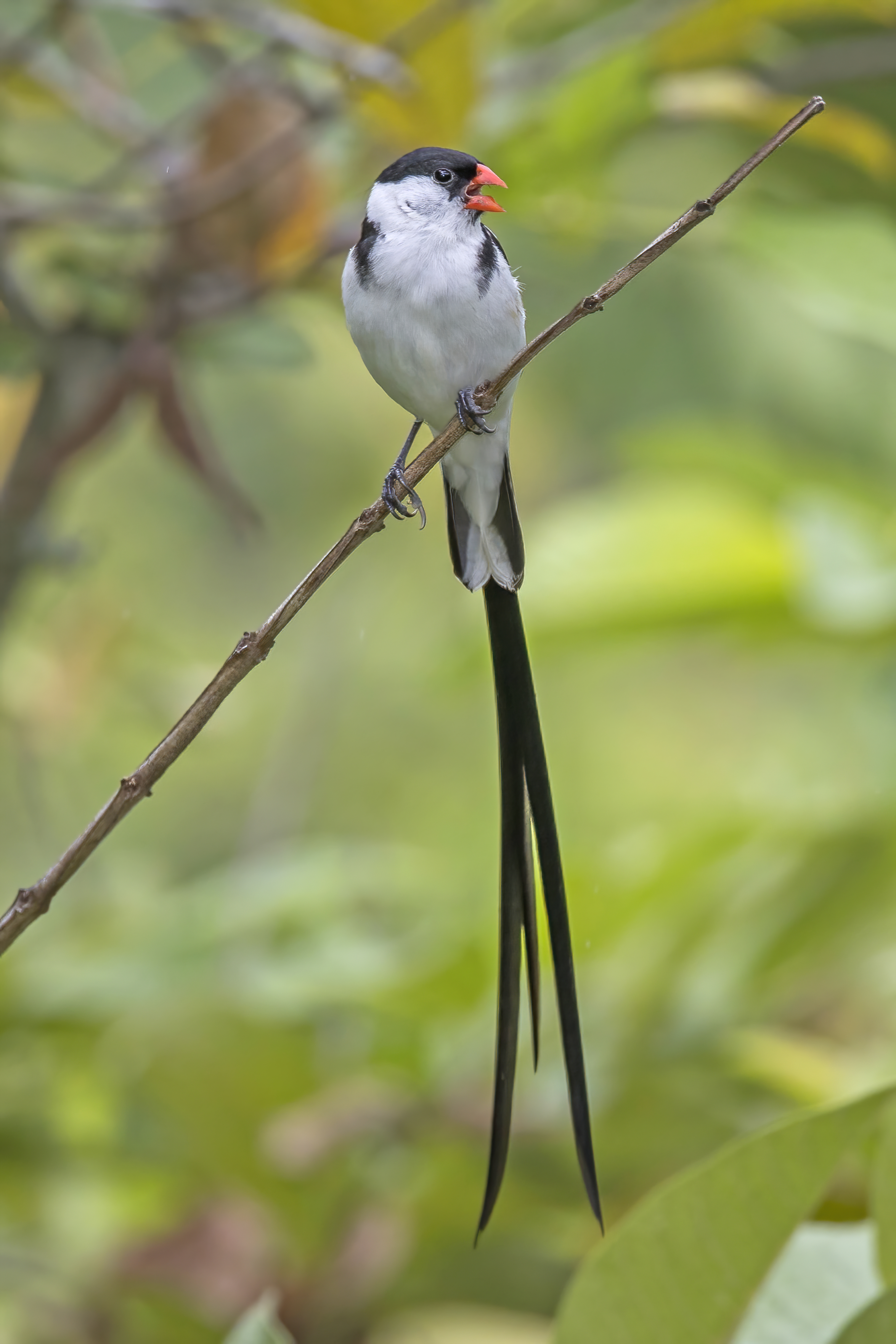
- Male in breeding plumage São Tomé and Príncipe

Conservation status
- Least Concern (IUCN 3.1)

Scientific classification
- Kingdom: Animalia
- Phylum: Chordata
- Class: Aves
- Order: Passeriformes
- Family: Viduidae
- Genus: Vidua
- Species: V. macroura

Binomial name
- Vidua macroura (Pallas, 1764)

Synonyms
- Fringilla macroura Pallas, 1764; Emberiza vidua Linnaeus, 1766

= Pin-tailed whydah =

Species of bird

The pin-tailed whydah (Vidua macroura) is a small songbird with a conspicuous pennant-like tail in breeding males. It is a resident breeding bird in most of Africa south of the Sahara Desert.

== Taxonomy ==
The pin-tailed whydah was first described by the German naturalist Peter Simon Pallas in 1764 and given the binomial name Fringilla macroura.

== Description ==
The pin-tailed whydah is 12–13 cm in length, although the breeding male's tail adds another 20 cm to this. The adult male has a black back and crown, and a very long black tail. The wings are dark brown with white patches, and the underparts and the head, apart from the crown, are white. The bill is bright red. The female and non-breeding male have streaked brown upperparts, whitish underparts with buff flanks, and a buff and black face pattern. They lack the long tail extension, but retain the red bill. Immature birds are like the female but plainer and with a greyish bill.

== Distribution and habitat ==
The pin-tailed whydah occurs in much of sub-Saharan Africa, favouring grassland, scrubs and savannah, also coming into parks and gardens. In Portugal it is established in the region around Aveiro, with observations occurring north and south of it. It has been introduced to southern California, with a sizable population existing there, as well as Puerto Rico and Singapore. It can be kept as a domesticated pet in the United States. It is also widely kept as a cage bird elsewhere, with occasional escapes and releases.

== Ecology ==
The species is a brood parasite which lays its eggs in the nests of estrildid finches, especially waxbills. Unlike the common cuckoo, it does not destroy the host's eggs. Typically, 2–4 eggs are added to those already present. The eggs of both the host and the whydah are white, although the whydah's are slightly larger. The nestling whydahs mimic the gape pattern of the fledglings of the host species.

The male pin-tailed whydah is territorial, and one male often has several females in his small group. He has an elaborate courtship flight display, which includes hovering over the female to display his tail. The song is given from a high perch, and consists of rapid squeaking and churring. The diet of this species consists of seeds and grain.

== Gallery ==
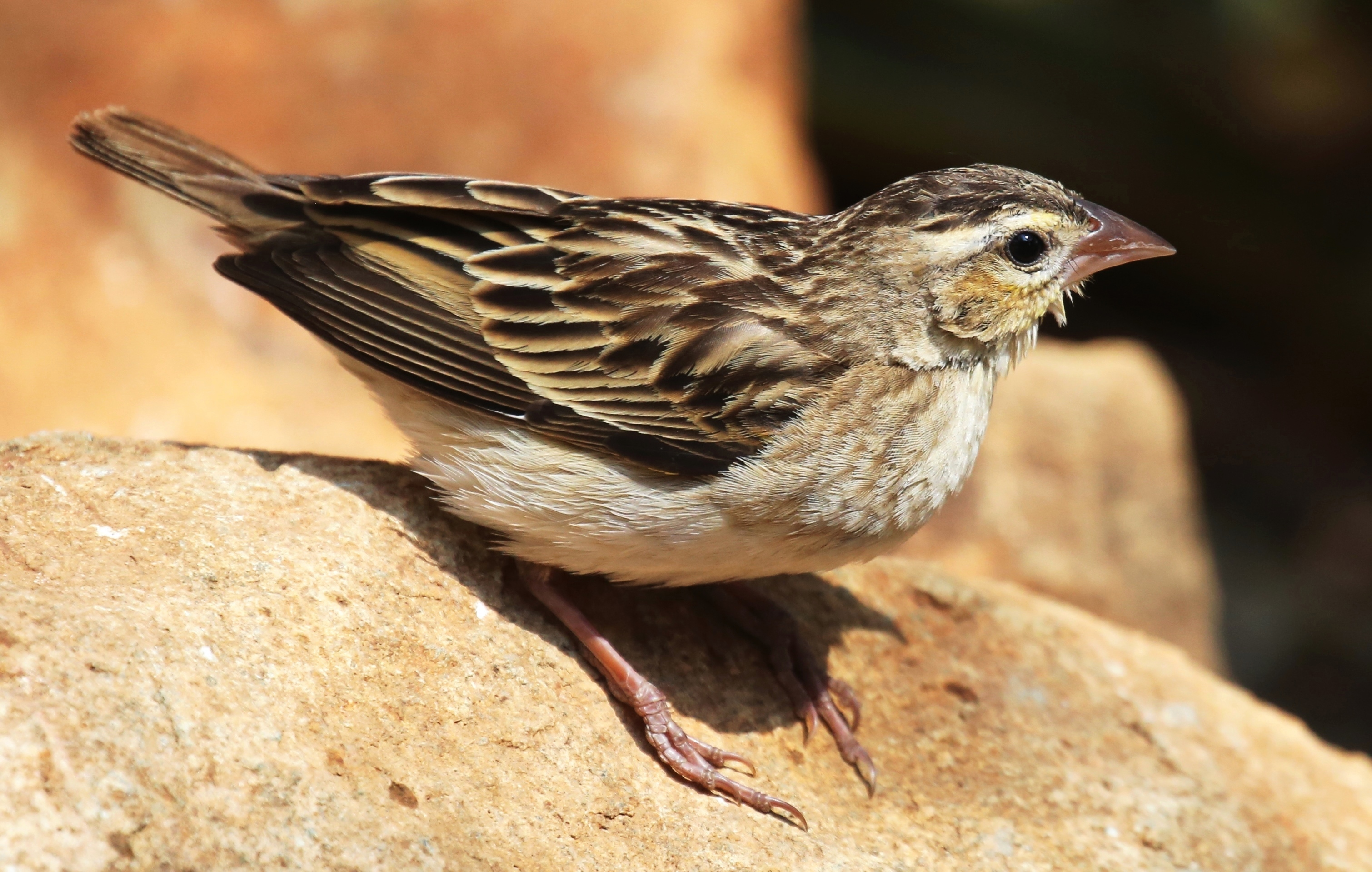
adult non-breeding female, Madikwe Game Reserve, South Africa

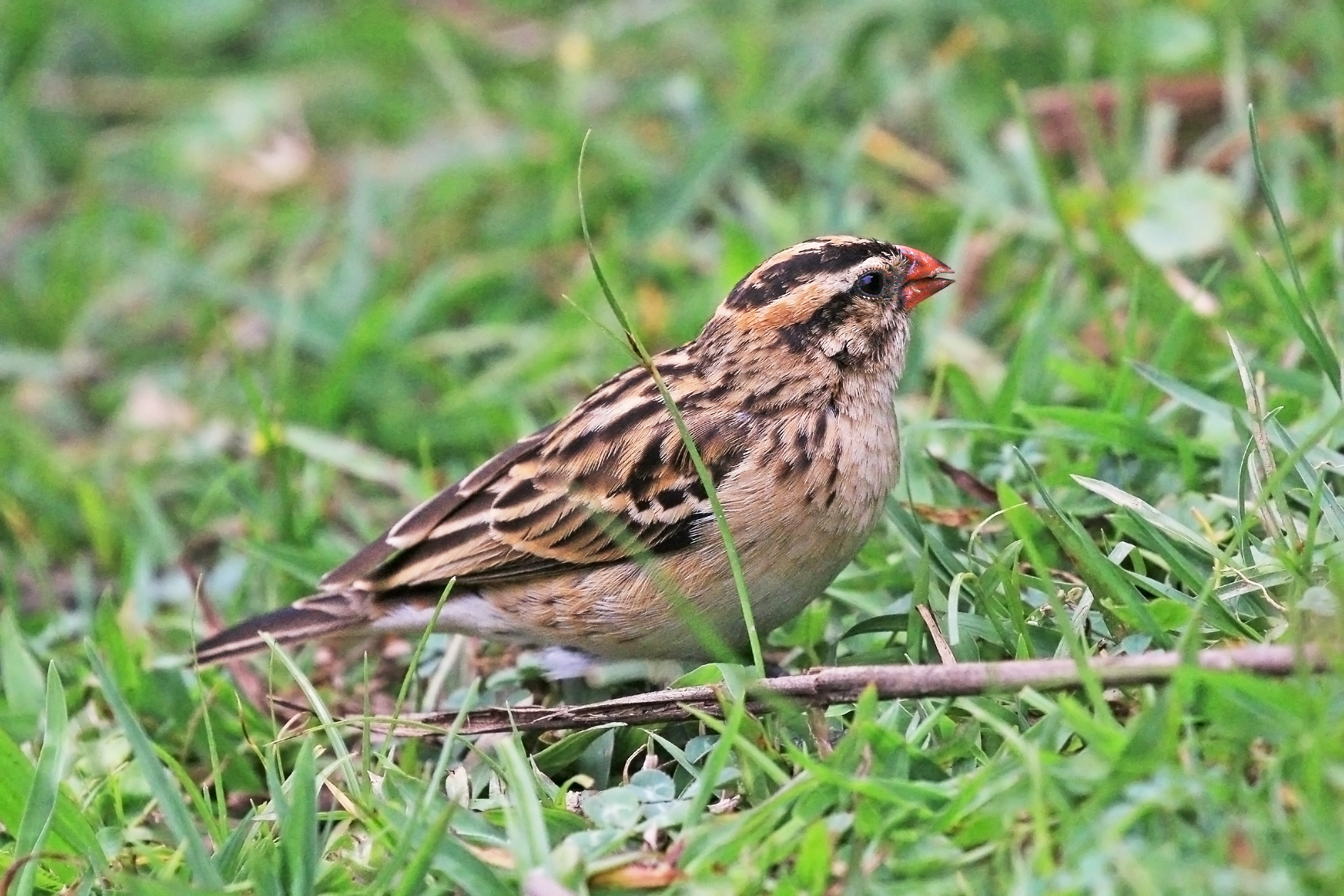
adult male in non-breeding plumage
Lake Bunyonyi, Uganda

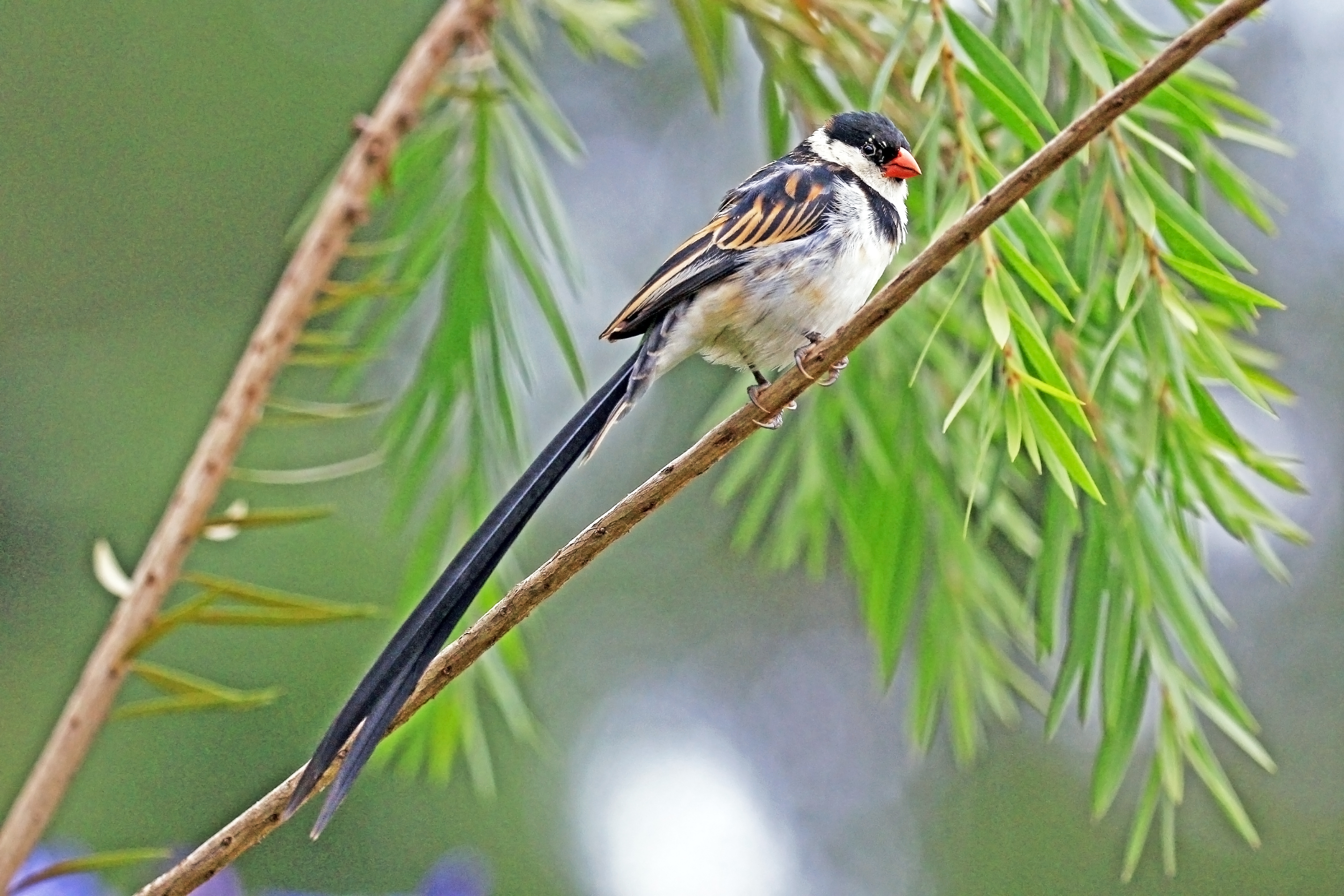
male in eclipse plumage at Lake Bunyonyi in Uganda

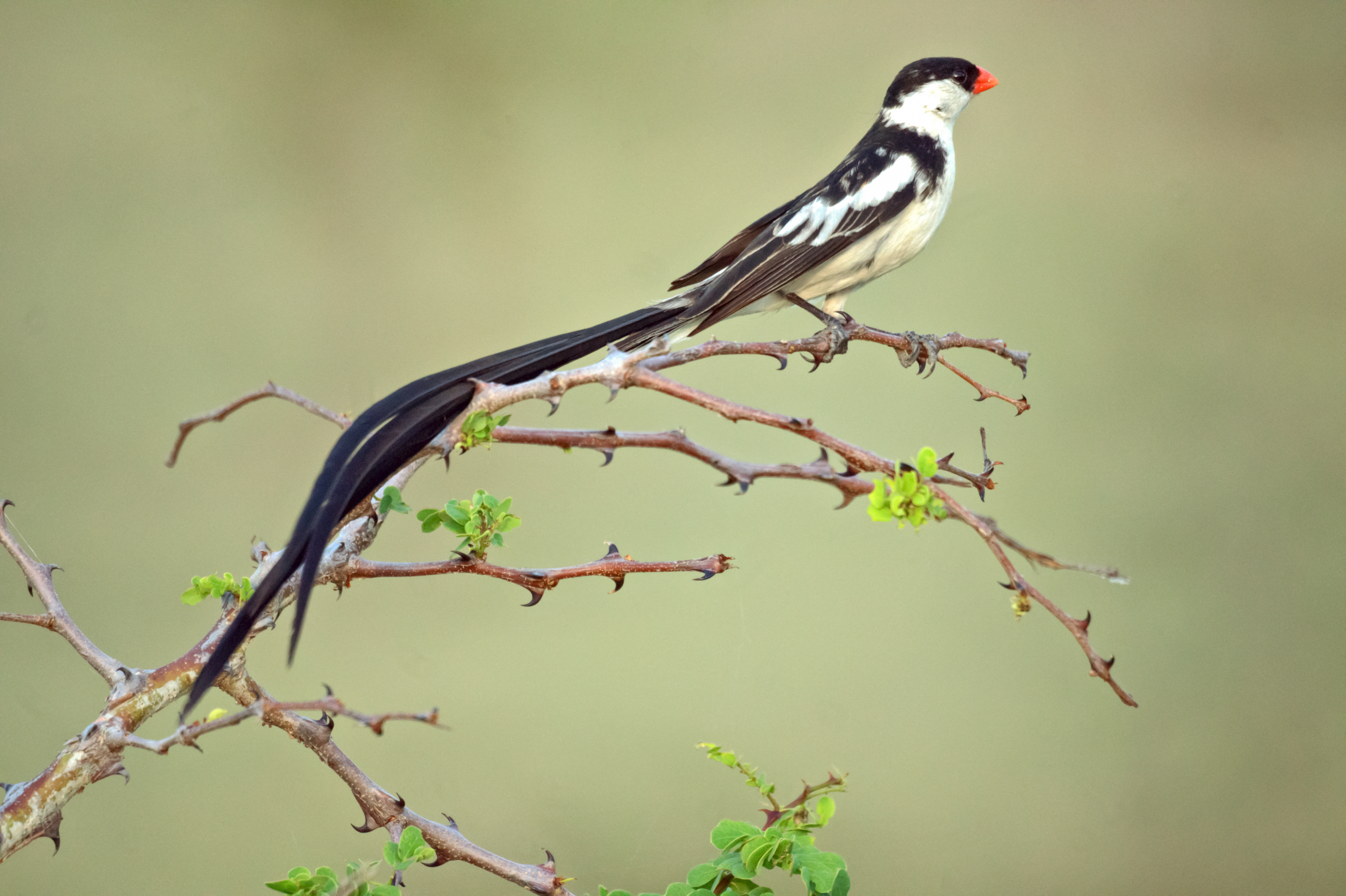
breeding male at
Londolozi Game Reserve, South Africa

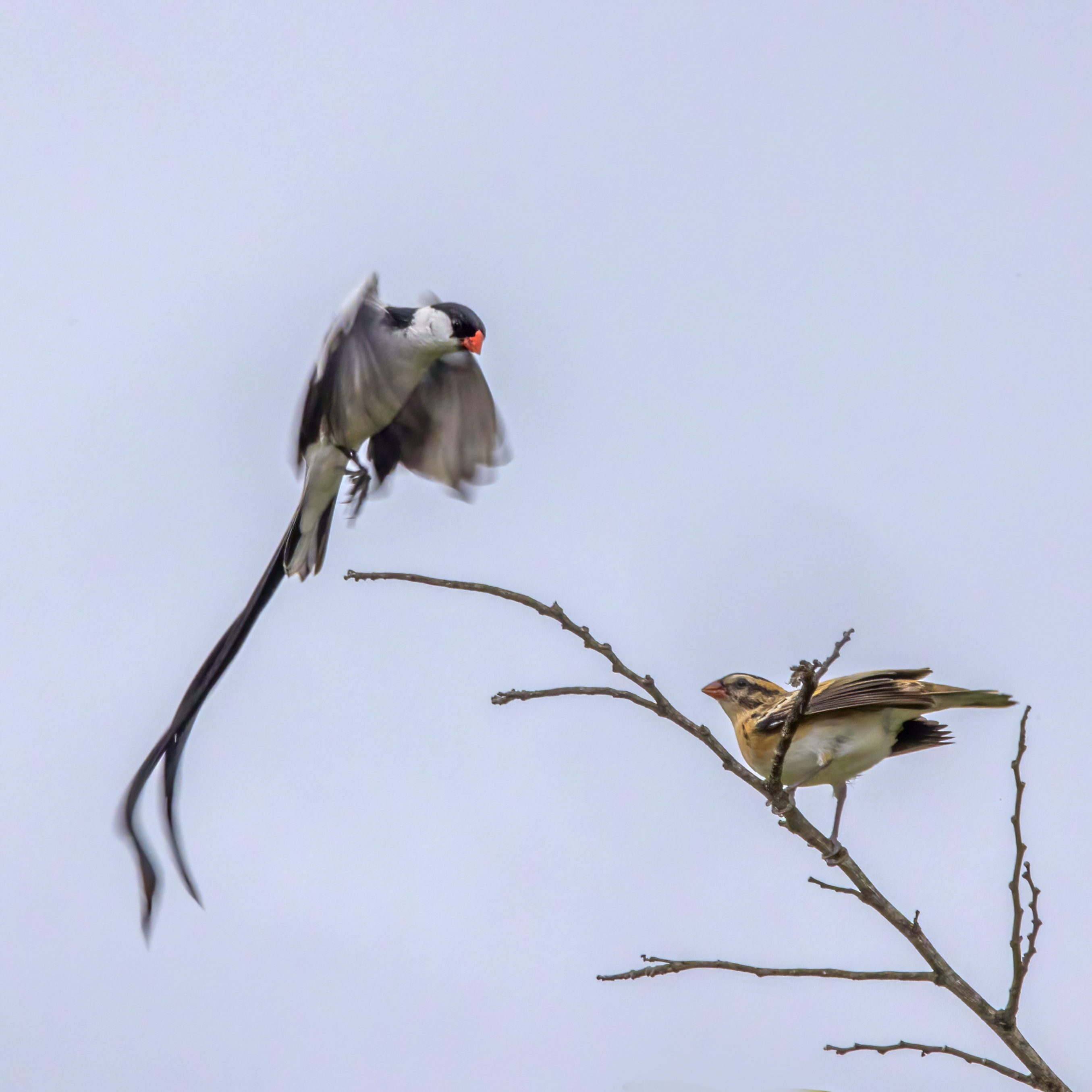
male displaying to a female, São Tomé and Príncipe

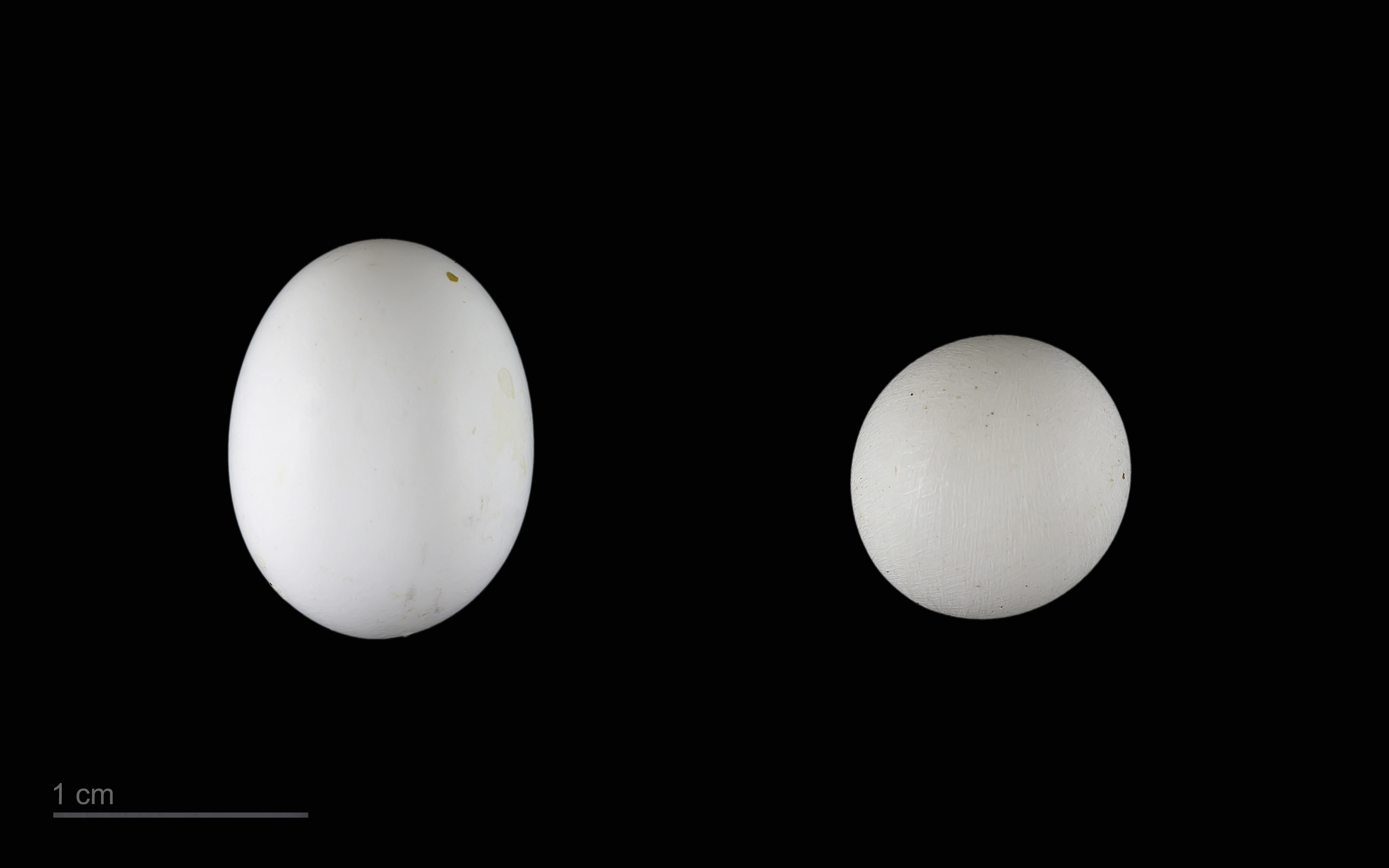
V. macroura egg (at left) with that of host species S. cucullata - MHNT
