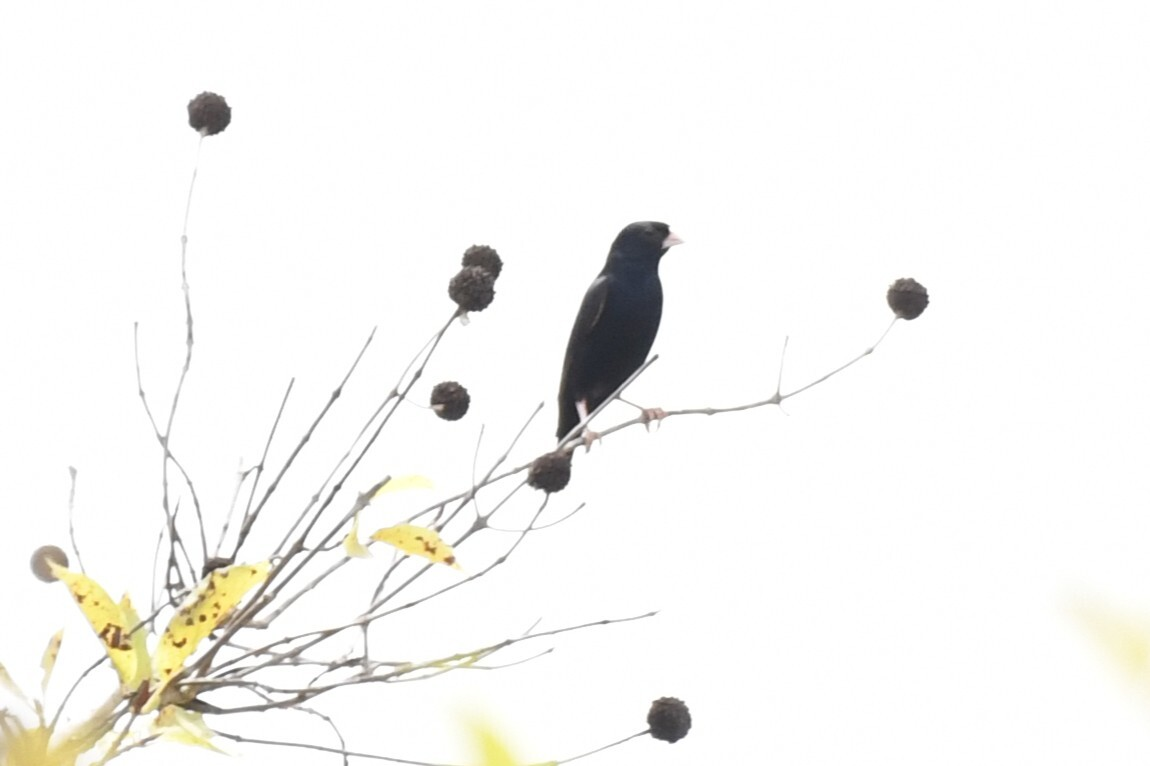

Conservation status
- Least Concern (IUCN 3.1)

Scientific classification
- Kingdom: Animalia
- Phylum: Chordata
- Class: Aves
- Order: Passeriformes
- Family: Viduidae
- Genus: Vidua
- Species: V. wilsoni

Binomial name
- Vidua wilsoni (Hartert, 1901)

= Wilson's indigobird =

Species of bird

Wilson's indigobird (Vidua wilsoni) or the pale-winged indigobird, is a species of bird in the family Viduidae. It is found in Cameroon, Central African Republic, Chad, Republic of the Congo, Democratic Republic of the Congo, Ivory Coast, Ghana, Guinea, Guinea-Bissau, Nigeria, Senegal, South Sudan, and Togo.

== See also ==
- Vidua
