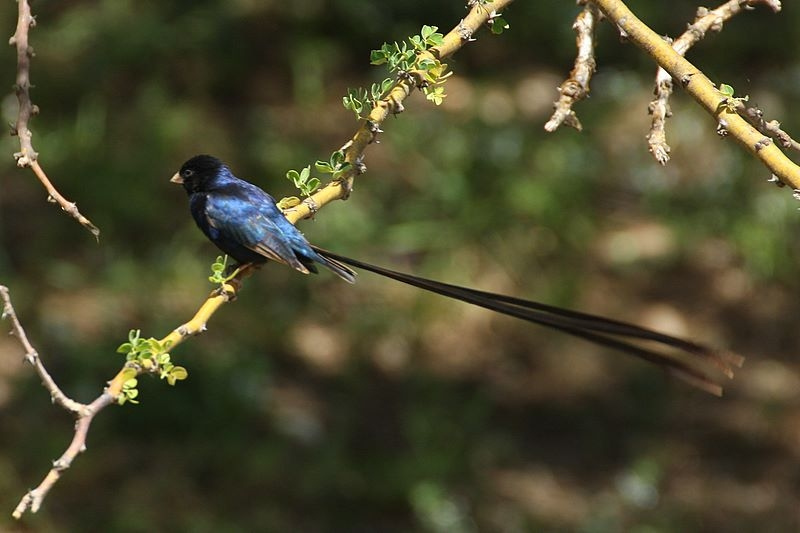
- Male in Tanzania

Conservation status
- Least Concern (IUCN 3.1)

Scientific classification
- Kingdom: Animalia
- Phylum: Chordata
- Class: Aves
- Order: Passeriformes
- Family: Viduidae
- Genus: Vidua
- Species: V. hypocherina

Binomial name
- Vidua hypocherina Verreaux & Verreaux, 1856

= Steel-blue whydah =

Species of bird

The steel-blue whydah (Vidua hypocherina) is a species of bird in the family Viduidae. It is found in Ethiopia, Kenya, Somalia, South Sudan, Tanzania, and Uganda. Its natural habitat is dry savanna.
