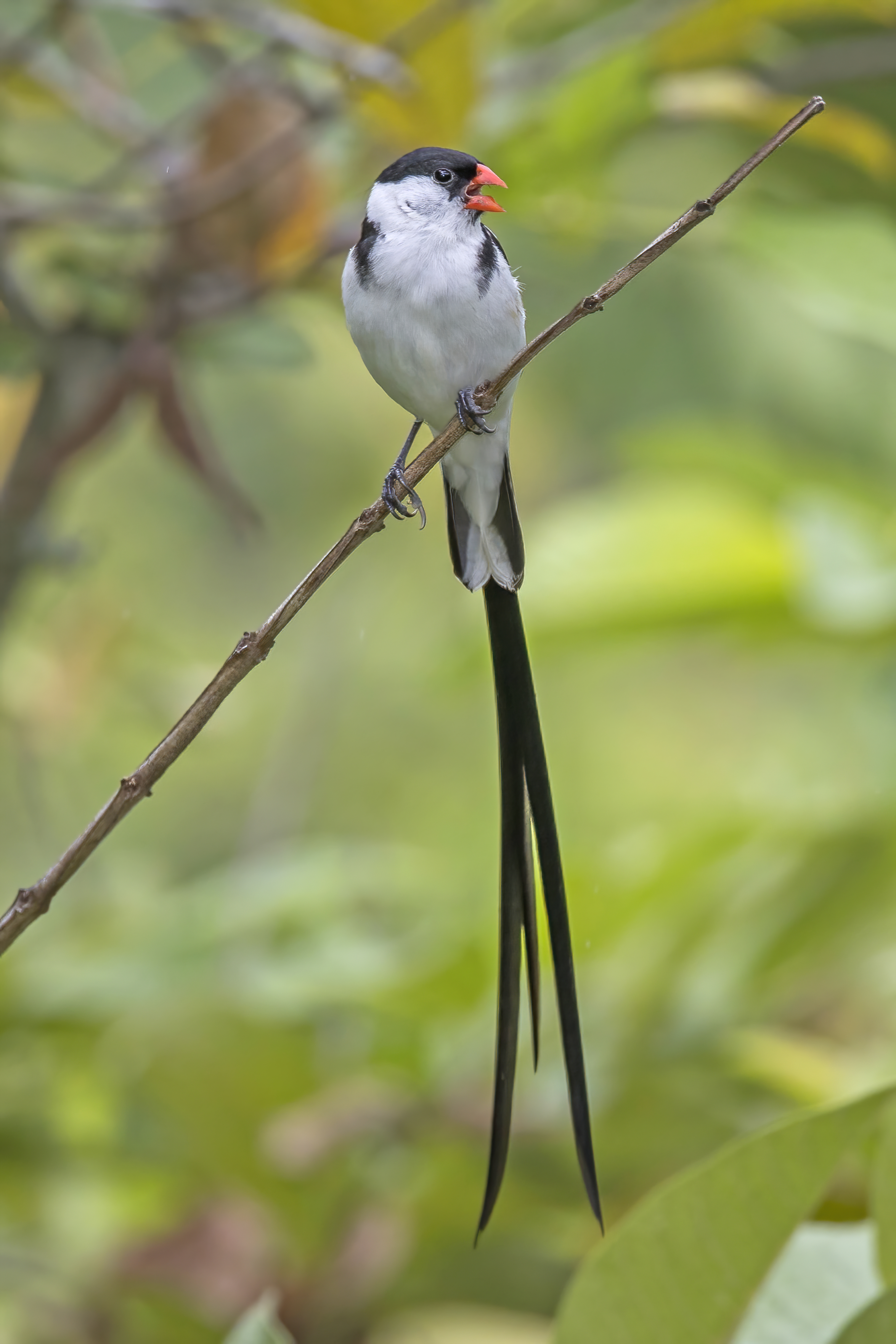
- Pin-tailed whydah (Vidua macroura)

Scientific classification
- Kingdom: Animalia
- Phylum: Chordata
- Class: Aves
- Order: Passeriformes
- Superfamily: Ploceoidea
- Family: Viduidae

Genera
- Vidua; Anomalospiza

= Viduidae =

Family of birds

The indigobirds, whydahs and cuckoo-finch make up the family Viduidae; they are small passerine birds native to Africa.

These are finch-like species which usually have black or indigo predominating in their plumage. The birds named "whydahs" have long or very long tails in the breeding male.

All are obligate brood parasites, which lay their eggs in the nests of songbird species; most indigobirds use firefinches as hosts, whereas the paradise whydahs choose pytilias and the cuckoo-finch parasitises cisticolids. Unlike the cuckoos and honeyguides, the indigobirds and whydahs do not destroy the host's eggs. Typically, they lay 2–4 eggs in with those already present. The eggs of both the host and the victim are white, although the indigobird's are slightly larger. Many of the indigo-plumaged species named "indigobirds" are very similar in appearance, with the males difficult to separate in the field, and the young and females near impossible. The best guide is often the estrildid finch with which they are associating, since each indigobird parasitises a different host species. For example, the village indigobird is usually found with red-billed firefinches. Indigobirds and whydahs imitate their host's song, which the males learn in the nest. Although females do not sing, they also learn to recognise the song, and choose males with the same song, thus perpetuating the link between each species of indigobird and firefinch. The nestling indigobirds mimic the unique gape pattern of the fledglings of the host species.

The matching with the host is the driving force behind speciation in this family, but the close genetic and morphological similarities among species suggest that they are of recent origin.

The family contains two genera:

Image	Genus	Living species
	Vidua Cuvier, 1816	Village indigobird, Vidua chalybeata; Purple indigobird, Vidua purpurascens; Jambandu indigobird, Vidua raricola; Barka indigobird, Vidua larvaticola; Dusky indigobird, Vidua funerea; Zambezi indigobird Vidua codringtoni; Wilson's indigobird, Vidua wilsoni; Quailfinch indigobird, Vidua nigeriae; Jos Plateau indigobird, Vidua maryae; Cameroon indigobird, Vidua camerunensis; Pin-tailed whydah, Vidua macroura; Steel-blue whydah, Vidua hypocherina; Straw-tailed whydah, Vidua fischeri; Shaft-tailed whydah, Vidua regia; Long-tailed paradise whydah, Vidua paradisaea; Sahel paradise whydah, Vidua orientalis; Exclamatory paradise whydah, Vidua interjecta; Togo paradise whydah, Vidua togoensis; Broad-tailed paradise whydah, Vidua obtusa
	Anomalospiza Shelley, 1901	Cuckoo-finch or parasitic weaver, Anomalospiza imberbis

== Sources ==
- Payne, Robert (2010). "Family Viduidae (Whydahs and Indigobirds)". In del Hoyo, Josep; Elliott, Andrew; Christie, David (eds.). Handbook of the Birds of the World Volume 15: Weavers to New World Warblers. Barcelona: Lynx Edicions. ISBN 978-84-96553-45-3. Archived from the original on 2012-06-22.
