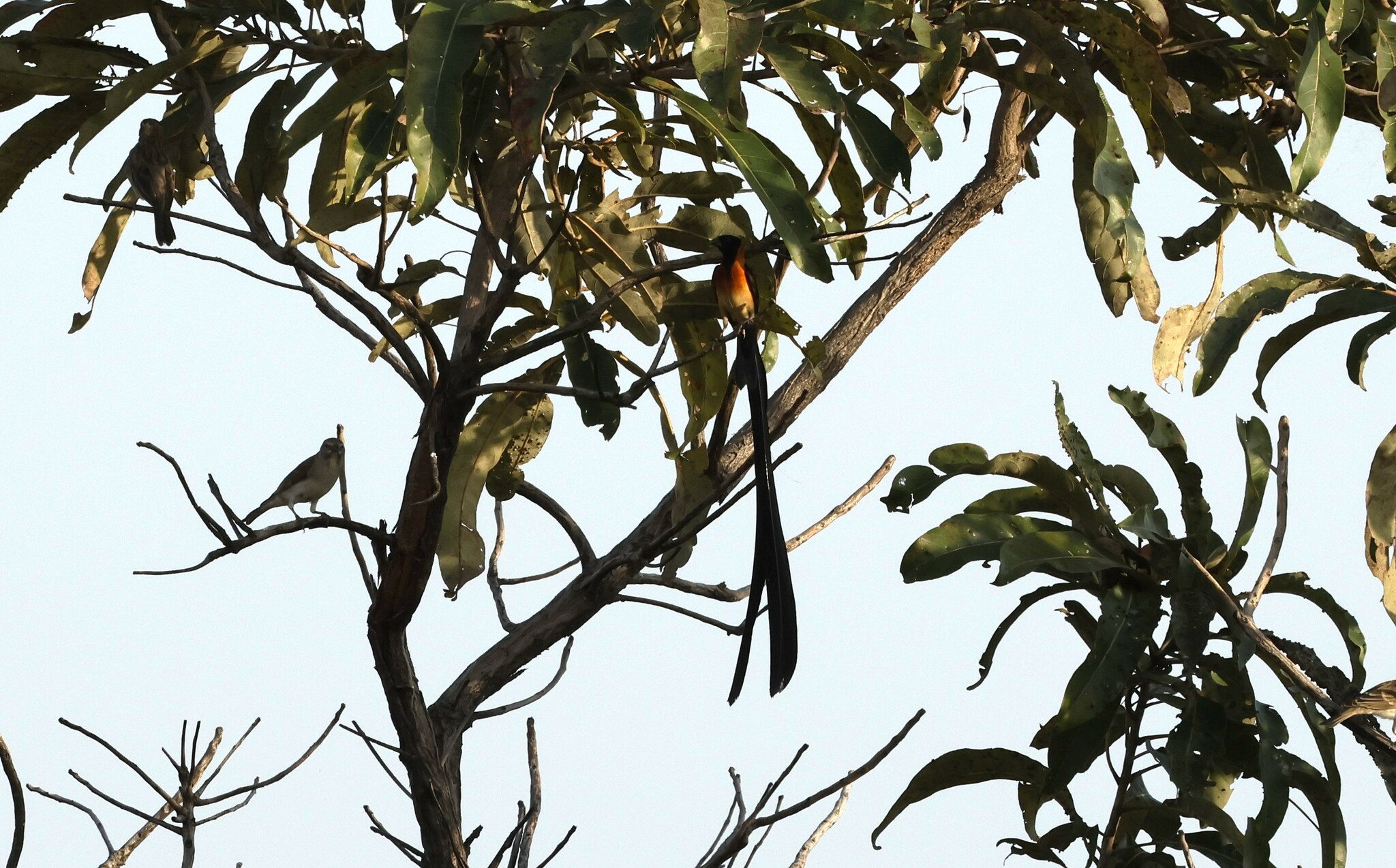

Conservation status
- Least Concern (IUCN 3.1)

Scientific classification
- Kingdom: Animalia
- Phylum: Chordata
- Class: Aves
- Order: Passeriformes
- Family: Viduidae
- Genus: Vidua
- Species: V. togoensis

Binomial name
- Vidua togoensis (Grote, 1923)

= Togo paradise whydah =

Species of bird

The Togo paradise whydah (Vidua togoensis) is a species of bird in the family Viduidae. It is found in Benin, Cameroon, Chad, Ivory Coast, Ghana, Mali, Sierra Leone, and Togo.
