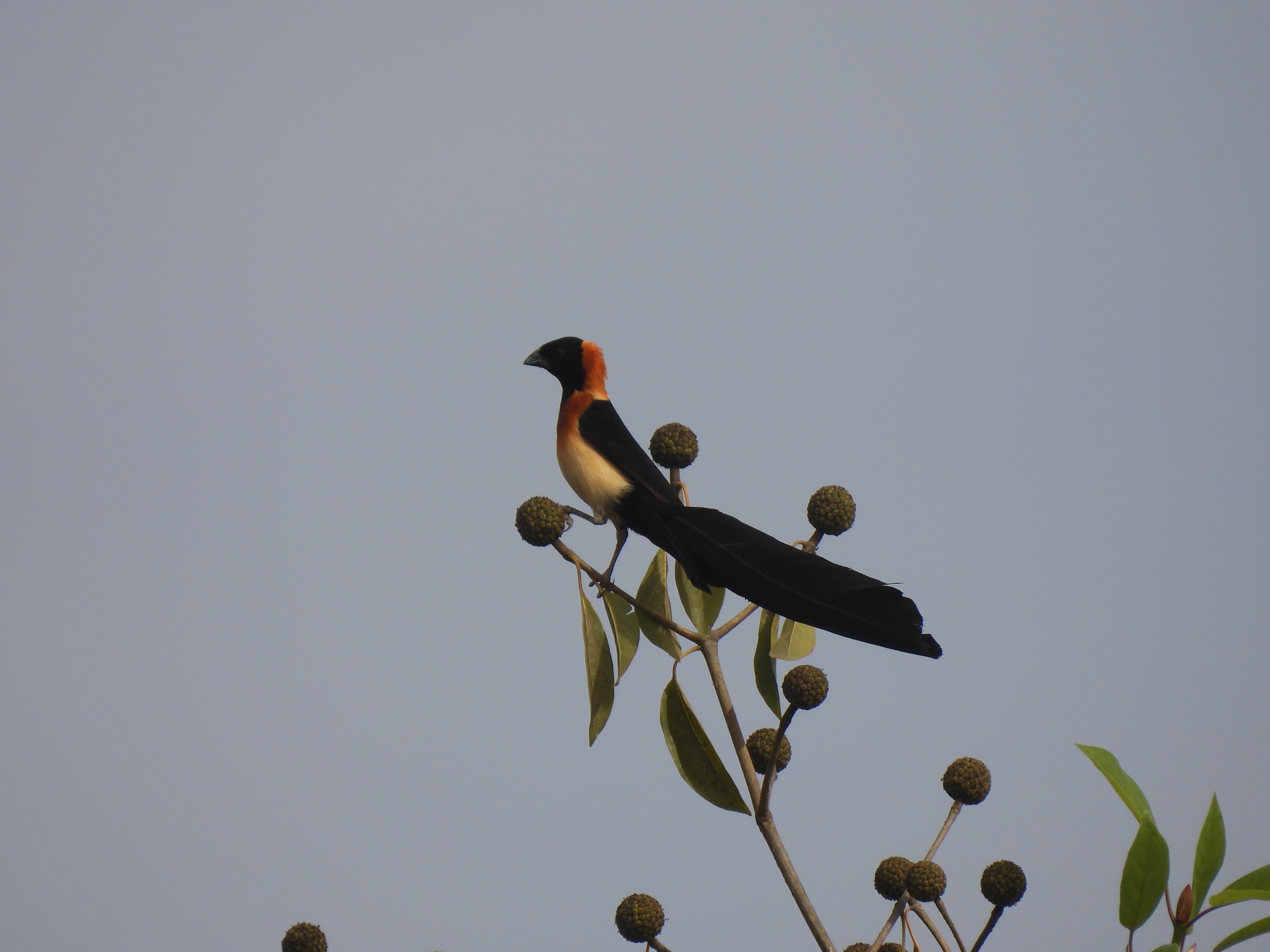
- Male V. o. aucupum in The Gambia in December 2021

Conservation status
- Least Concern (IUCN 3.1)

Scientific classification
- Kingdom: Animalia
- Phylum: Chordata
- Class: Aves
- Order: Passeriformes
- Family: Viduidae
- Genus: Vidua
- Species: V. orientalis

Binomial name
- Vidua orientalis Heuglin, 1870

= Sahel paradise whydah =

Species of bird

The Sahel paradise whydah, or northern paradise whydah (Vidua orientalis) is a small songbird in the passerine family Viduidae.

== Taxonomy ==
Vidua orientalis has in the past sometimes been considered a subspecies of eastern paradise whydah, Vidua paradisea, since both birds parasitise the green-winged pytilia Pytilia melba, a common species of waxbill. However, the pytilia has two subspecies, nominate P. m. melba and P. m. citerior, which are sometimes treated as separate species; the ranges of these two subspecies correspond well to those of V. paradisea and V. orientalis, respectively.

== Subspecies ==
Two subspecies are accepted:

- Vidua orientalis orientalis, occurring from northern Cameroon to southern Chad, northwestern Ethiopia, and Eritrea.
- Vidua orientalis aucupum, occurring from southern Mauritania, Senegal, and Gambia to northwestern Nigeria.

== Distribution and habitat ==
Vidua orientalis is a resident breeding bird in the Sahel region of north tropical Africa. It lives in open acacia savannah with scattered trees.

== Description ==
The females are 13–14 cm (5.1–5.5 in) long, tawny above with narrow mantle streaking; in females a dark line extends behind the eye. When in non-breeding plumage, the males are similar to the females; juveniles are also similar to adult females. The males in breeding plumage have black back and wings, with a rufous breast and pale belly; the head is black, with a pale nape; this is straw-yellow in the nominate eastern subspecies V. o. orientalis, and chestnut-toned like the breast in the western subspecies V. o. aucupum. The feet and the bill are dark grey. The dual-length ornamental tail feathers are black. These tail feathers have a width of 24–32 millimetres (0.94–1.26 in) and give breeding season males a full length of 30–31 cm (12–12 in).

== Biology and behaviour ==
The Sahel paradise whydah does not build its own nests, but parasitises the green-winged pytilia Pytilia melba. Like other whydahs, it does not destroy the host's eggs, but they deposit their own eggs in the nests of their hosts, adding them to those already present. As in other whydah species, the songs of the males mimic the song of their hosts. These birds do not form monogamous pairs, but males will breed with many females. In a breeding season females may lay about 22 eggs, that hatch after 12–13 days of incubation. The diet consists of seeds and grain.
