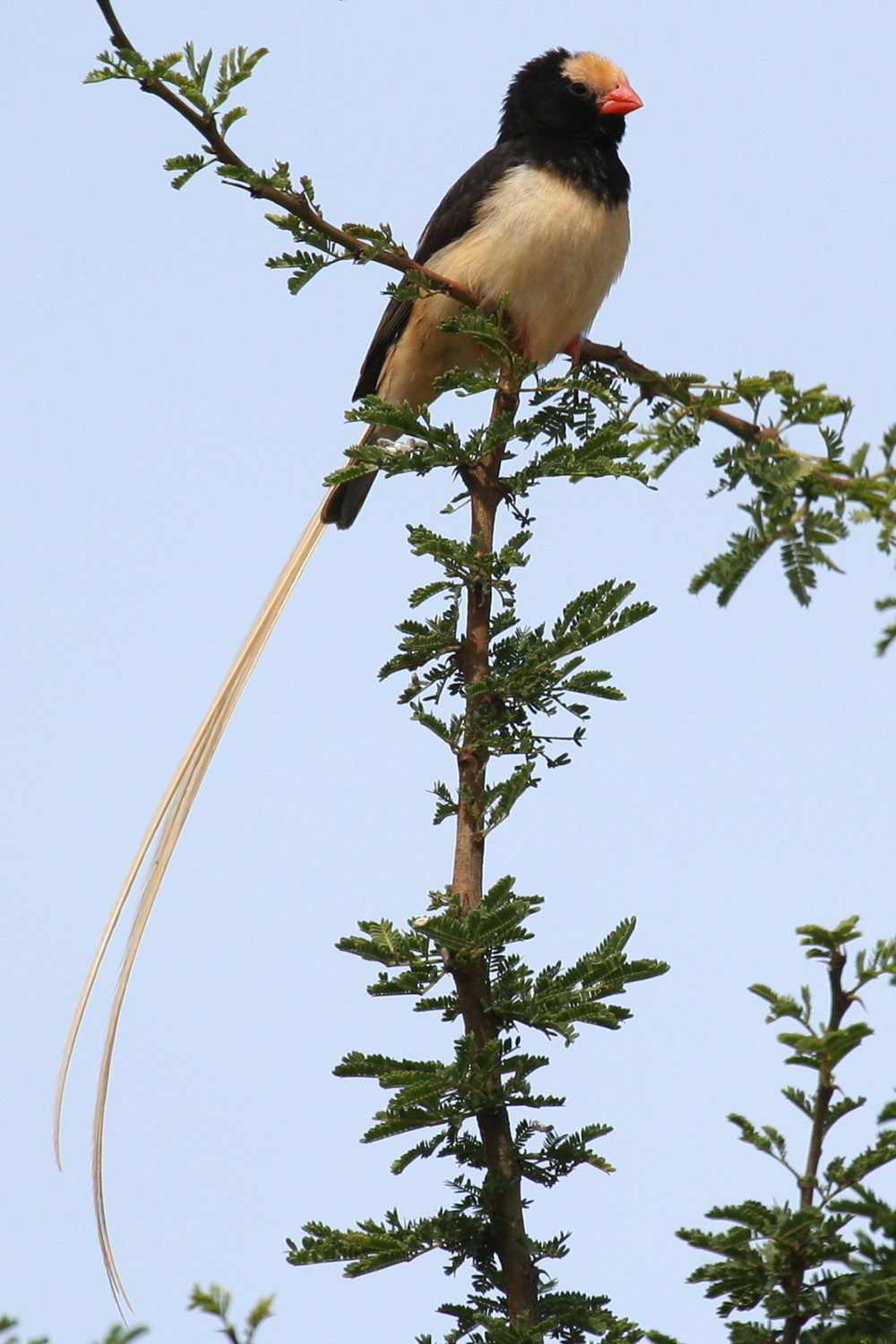
- Adult male

Conservation status
- Least Concern (IUCN 3.1)

Scientific classification
- Kingdom: Animalia
- Phylum: Chordata
- Class: Aves
- Order: Passeriformes
- Family: Viduidae
- Genus: Vidua
- Species: V. fischeri

Binomial name
- Vidua fischeri (Reichenow, 1882)

= Straw-tailed whydah =

Species of bird

The straw-tailed whydah (Vidua fischeri) is a species of bird in the family Viduidae. It is found in Ethiopia, Kenya, Somalia, South Sudan, Tanzania, and Uganda. Its natural habitat is dry savanna. Like all other whydah species, the straw-tailed whydah is a brood parasite.
