= Hermann Grote =

German ornithologist (1882–1951)

- Born: 7 July 1882
- Died: 12 August 1951 (aged 69); West Berlin, West Germany
- Occupation: German ornithologist

Hermann Grote (7 July 1882 – 12 August 1951) was a German ornithologist known for his studies of African avifauna.

While serving as a director of a sisal plantation in German East Africa, he published papers on the local avifauna (from 1909 to 1913). As a Russian POW during WWI, he learned Russian, a skill set he subsequently used to translate Russian ornithological works into German. During his career, he was associated with ornithological research performed at the Museum für Naturkunde in Berlin.

In 1923 he was elected a corresponding fellow of the American Ornithologists' Union.

== Taxa described by Grote ==
- Elminia albonotata subcaerulea (1923), a subspecies of the white-tailed crested flycatcher.
- Vidua togoensis (1923), the Togo paradise whydah.

== Selected writings ==
- Beitrag zur Ornis des südöstlichen Deutsch-Ostafrika, 1912 – Contributions to the ornithology of southeastern German East Africa.
- Über einige gefangene ostafrikanische Vögel, 1912 – On some captive East African birds.
- Aus der ornithologischen Literatur Russlands: Berichte und Übersetzungen, Volume 5, 1925 – On Russian ornithological literature; reports and translations.
- Beitrag zur Kenntnis der Vogelfauna des Graslandes von Neukamerun. 1925 – Contributions associated with birds native to the grasslands of Neukamerun.
- Brutbiologisches aus N.A. Sarudnys Schriften, 1934 – Breeding biology by Nicholas Alexievich Sarudny.
- "Collected Papers on Ornithology", 1935.
- Neue Beiträge zur Kenntnis der palaearktischen Zugvögel in Afrika, 1937 – New contributions involving Palearctic migrant birds in Africa.
