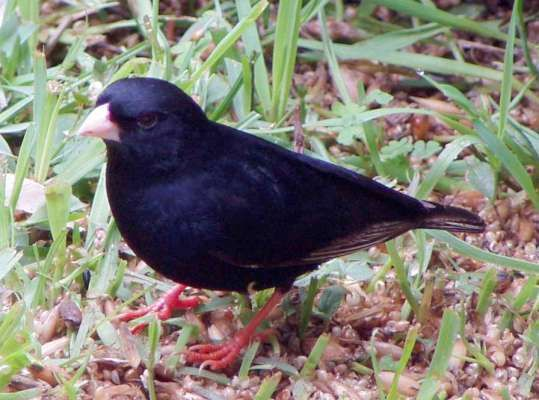
- A male photographed in Pietermaritzburg, South Africa.

Conservation status
- Least Concern (IUCN 3.1)

Scientific classification
- Kingdom: Animalia
- Phylum: Chordata
- Class: Aves
- Order: Passeriformes
- Family: Viduidae
- Genus: Vidua
- Species: V. funerea

Binomial name
- Vidua funerea (de Tarragon, 1847)

= Dusky indigobird =

Species of bird

The name dusky indigobird can also refer to Vidua purpurascens.

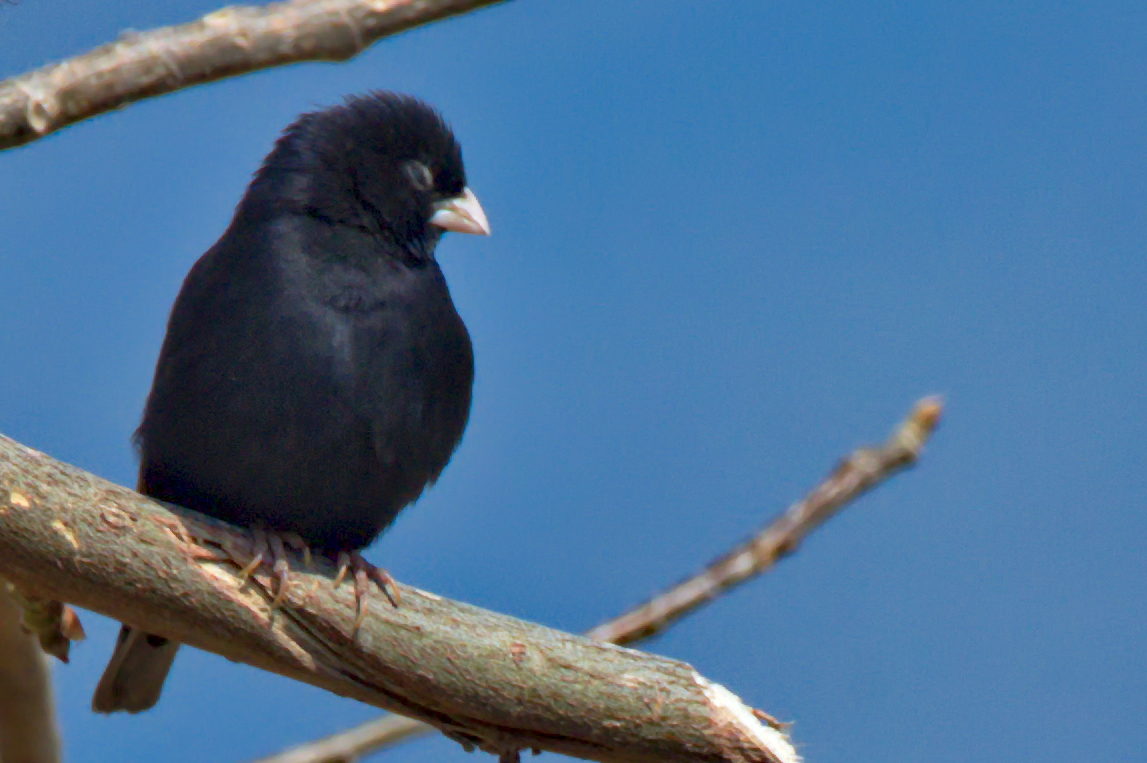
Dusky Indigobird

The dusky indigobird, variable indigobird, or black widowfinch (Vidua funerea) is a species of bird in the family Viduidae. It is found in Angola, Burundi, Cameroon, Republic of the Congo, Democratic Republic of the Congo, Eswatini, Guinea-Bissau, Malawi, Mozambique, Nigeria, Sierra Leone, South Africa, Tanzania, Zambia, and Zimbabwe. Its natural habitat is moist savanna.
