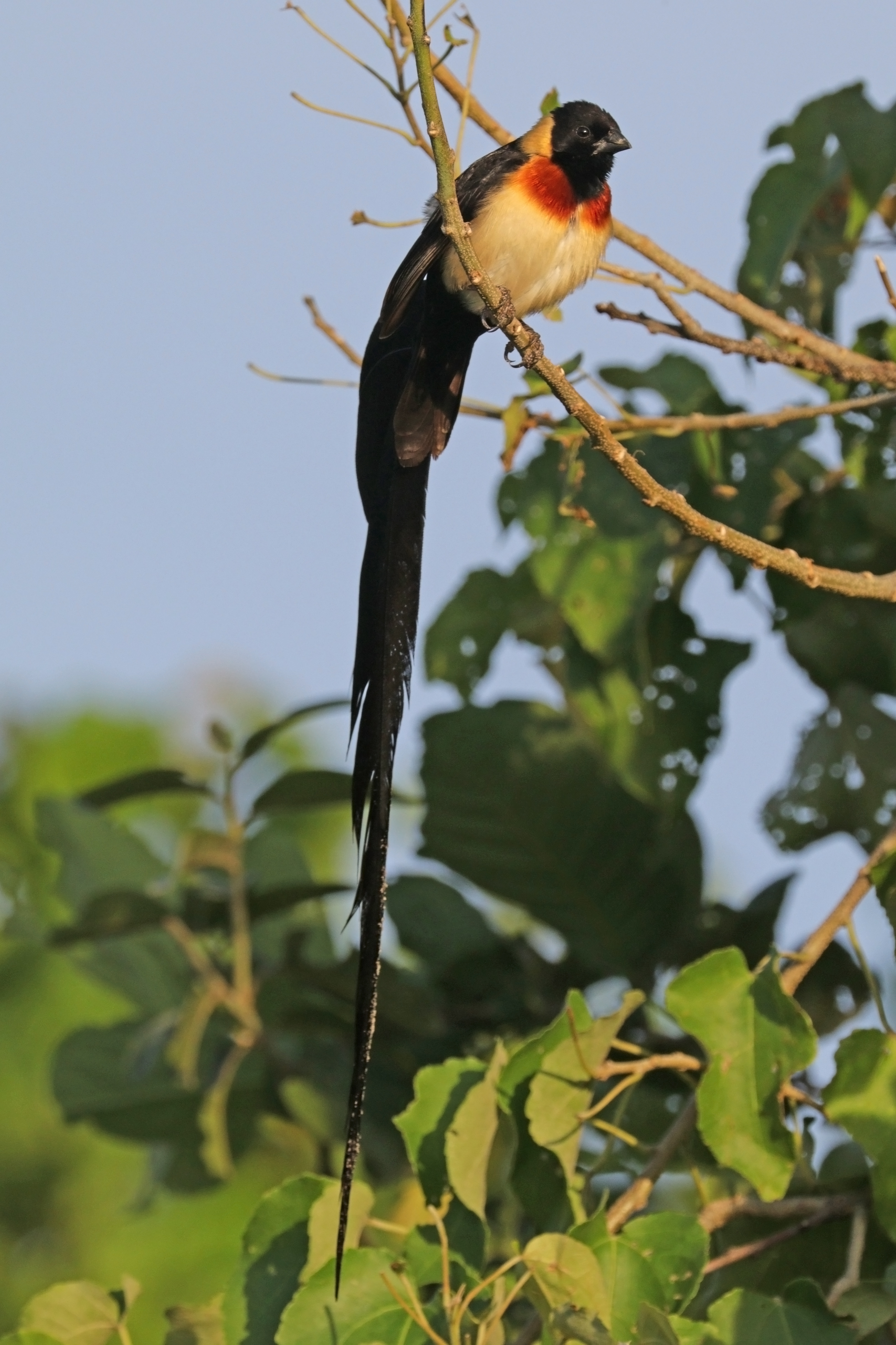
- Male, Chobe National Park, Botswana

Conservation status
- Least Concern (IUCN 3.1)

Scientific classification
- Kingdom: Animalia
- Phylum: Chordata
- Class: Aves
- Order: Passeriformes
- Family: Viduidae
- Genus: Vidua
- Species: V. paradisaea

Binomial name
- Vidua paradisaea (Linnaeus, 1758)
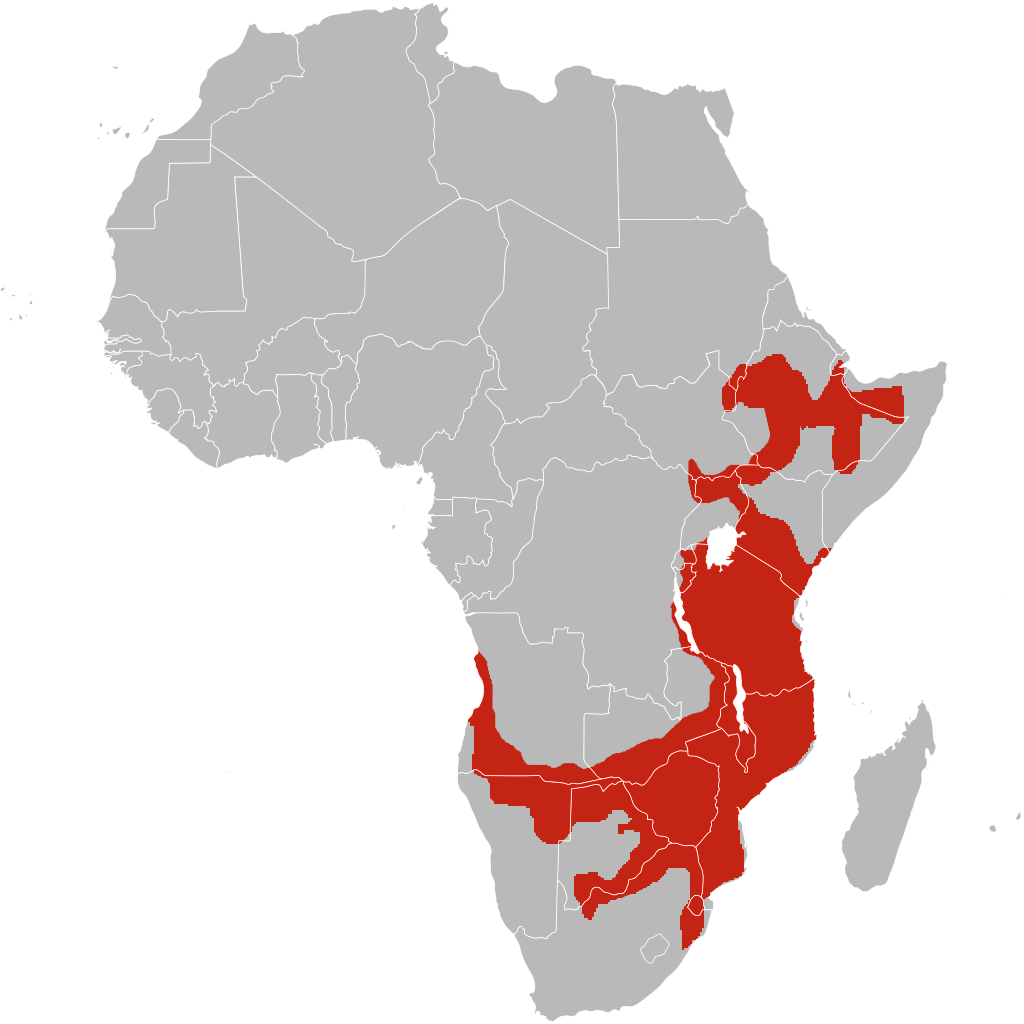
- resident range

Synonyms
- Emberiza paradisaea Linnaeus, 1758

= Long-tailed paradise whydah =

Species of bird

The long-tailed paradise whydah or eastern paradise whydah (Vidua paradisaea) is a bird in the family Viduidae of the order Passeriformes. It is a small passerine with a short, stubby bill, found across eastern and southern Africa from Ethiopia south to South Africa and west to Angola. It is mostly granivorous, and feed on seeds that have ripened and fallen on the ground. The ability to distinguish between males and females is quite difficult unless it is breeding season. During this time, the males moult into breeding plumage where they have a distinctive long tail. This can be up to three times longer than its own body or even more. Males are able to mimic songs where females can use that to discover their mate. However, there are some cases where females don't use songs to choose their mate but they use either male characteristics like plumage or they can have a shortage of options with song mimicry. Paradise whydahs are brood parasites. They do not destroy the host eggs that are originally there, but lay their own eggs alogside in the other bird's nest. Overall, these whydahs are considered least concern, based on the IUCN Red List of threatened species.

== Taxonomy and systematics ==
The long-tailed paradise whydah was formally described by the Swedish naturalist Carl Linnaeus in 1758 in the tenth edition of his Systema Naturae under the binomial name Emberiza paradisaea. It is now placed in the genus Vidua that was introduced by the French naturalist Georges Cuvier in 1816.

The long-tailed paradise whydah is a brood-parasitic bird like the rest of the species in the family Viduidae. The family diverged about 20 million years ago. The primary host species are in the family Estrildidae, also known as the waxbills. Most have included Viduidae within Estrilididae or Ploceidae (weavers) in a subfamily of its own. Similarly, Anomalospiza have been switched around between the two families and have not been linked with Vidua. However, studies has shown that the skull, the bony palate, the horny palate and the pterylosis are some of the morphological characters that support a close relationship between Anomalospiza and Vidua which are different from the weavers. Indigobirds are also part of the family Viduidae. The long-tailed whydah's relationship with the indigobirds are not well known. The indigobirds are more closely related to the straw-tailed whydah based on their phylogenetic relationship where researchers analysed mitochondrial restriction sites and nucleotide sequences.

== Description ==
Breeding male long-tailed paradise whydahs have black heads and back, a rusty coloured breast, a bright buffy-yellow nape, and white abdomen with broad, elongated black tail feathers that can grow up to 36 cm or more. When in non-breeding plumage, males are hard to distinguish from females, and in general, from other Viduidae species, as these differ from one another in size, in non-breeding plumage and colour, and in the songs used for mating.. Usually, they are about 13 cm in length and weigh about 21 grams. Females tend to have a grey bill and feathers that are greyish-brown with blackish streaks along with their under tail feather being more white. Males during the non-breeding season tend to have mostly browner plumage with black stripes on the crown, black parts along the face, and deeper brown colour for the chest and creamer colour for the abdomen.

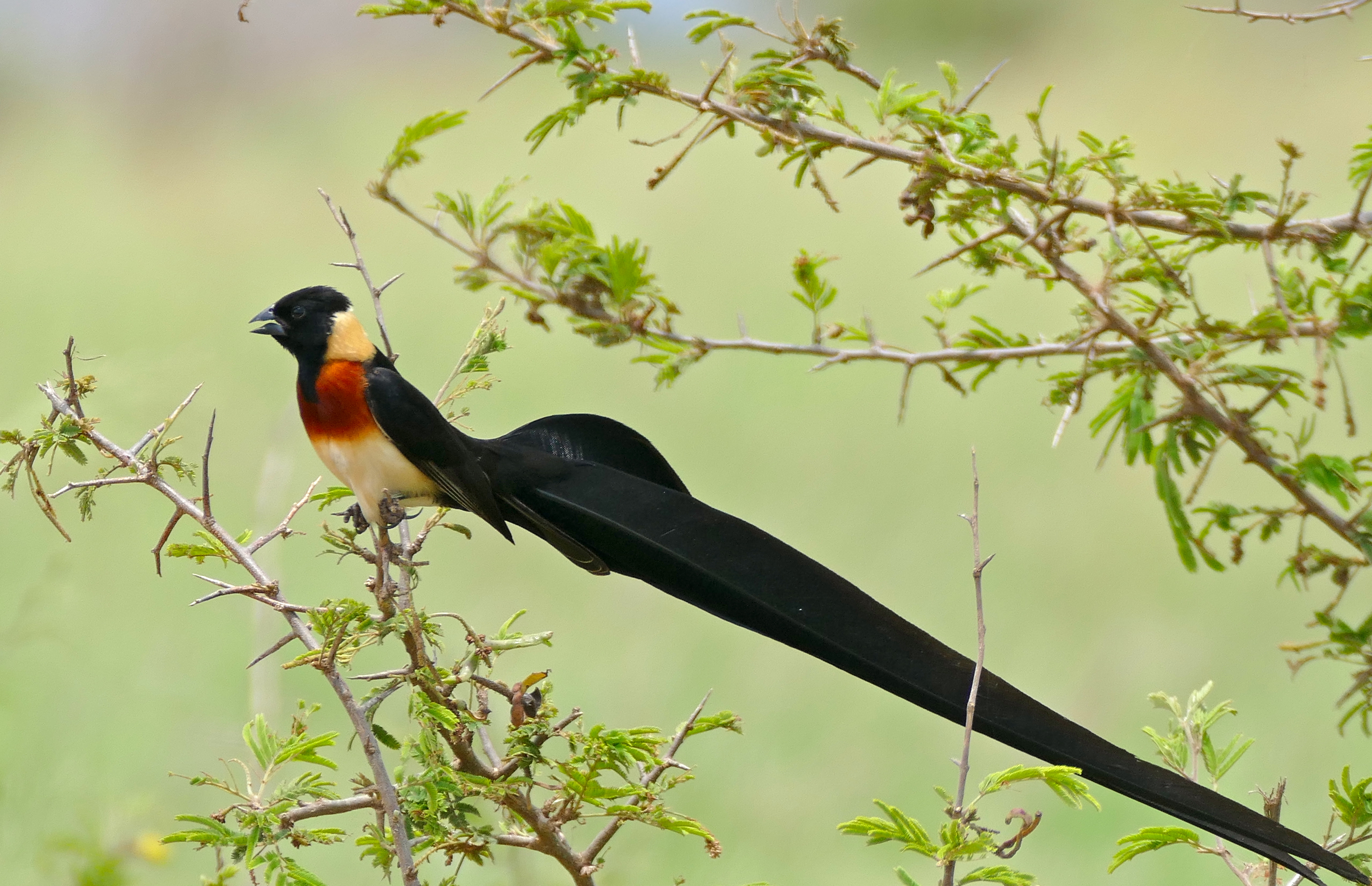
Male in breeding plumage

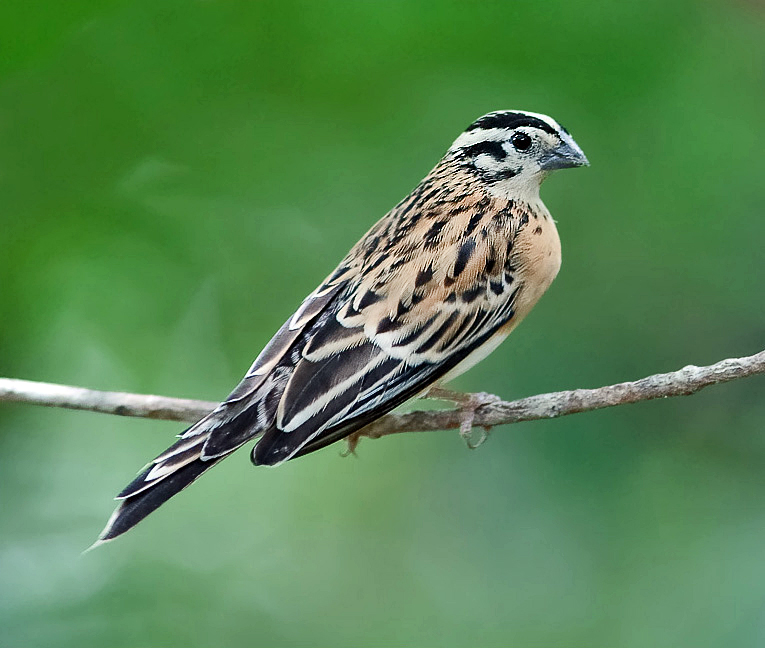
Female

== Distribution and habitat ==
The long-tailed paradise whydahs are found in grassland, savanna and open woodland where they live in bushed grassland around cultivation. The majority of the time, these whydahs stay away from surface waters.

== Behaviour and ecology ==
The long-tailed paradise whydah are known to be brood parasites where they would lay their eggs in nests of other songbirds. Furthermore, they usually roost together in flocks during both breeding and non-breeding seasons. Males develop the ability to mimic songs of their host. Studies showed that female whydahs respond more strongly to songs mimicked by males of their own species than they do to closely related species. Females use this mimicry to eliminate among potential mates and prefer those raised by the same host species. Hybrids can occur with other related paradise whydahs; researchers discovered that hybridisation can occur when female whydahs do not choose mates based on their song mimicry but instead on male traits such as plumage and flight displays if it is more important to them than song, or is restricted by the availability of males singing the appropriate host songs or if males is involved with unsolicited copulation with females of other parasitic species. Researchers discovered that these paradise whydahs mimic the songs of Melba Finch.

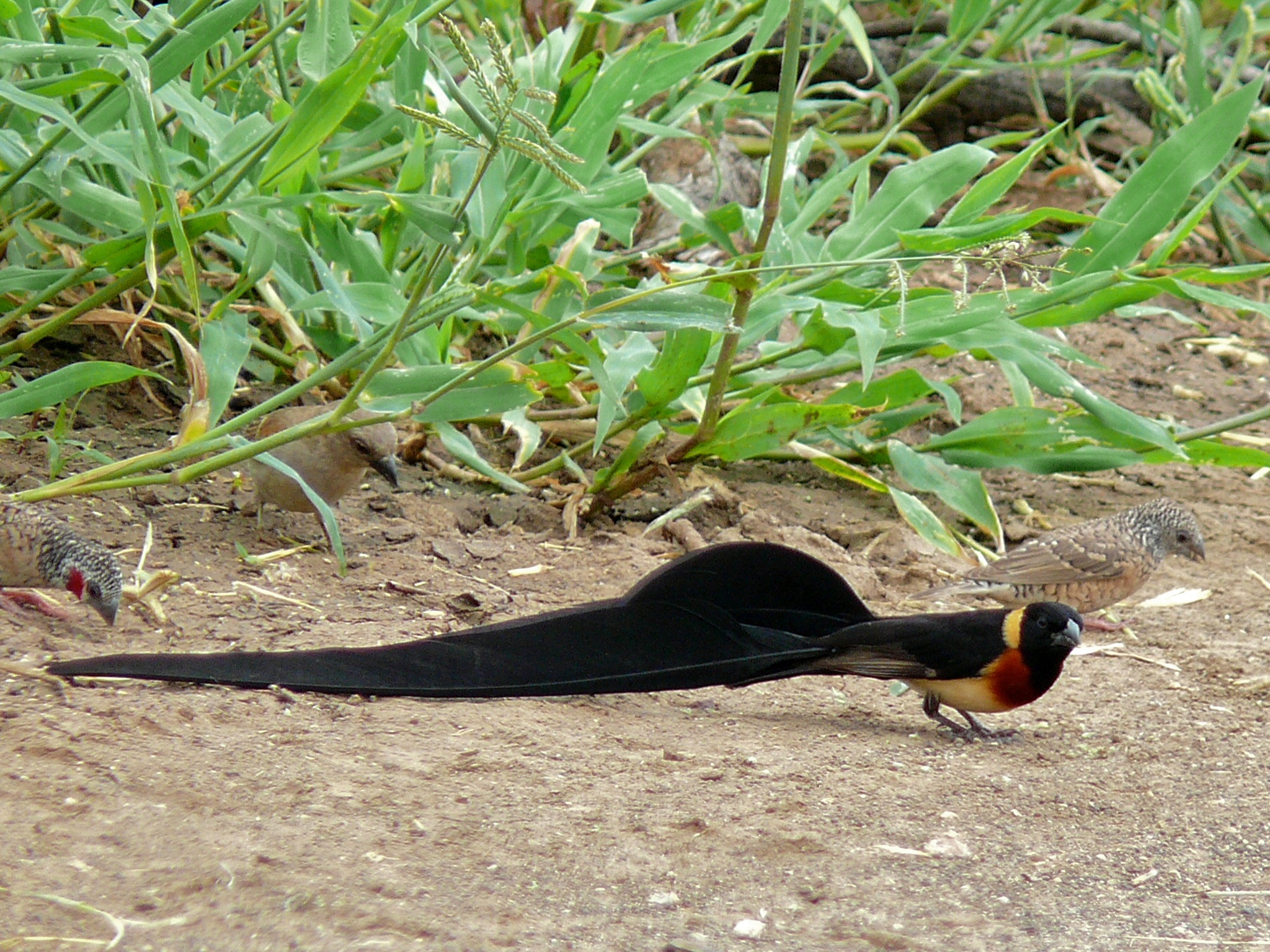
Long-tailed paradise whydah foraging for seeds on the ground

Additionally, these paradise whydahs are granivorous where they feed on small seed that ripen and fall on the ground. For foraging, they use something called "double scratch" where they use both of their feet almost simultaneously scratching the ground to find seeds in dust and hop backwards to pick up the seed. Another technique they use is their tongue. They dehusk grass seeds with their bill by rolling the seeds with their tongue one at a time back and forth against the ridge of the palate.

== Relationship to humans ==
Whydahs in general have been kept for many years as cage birds, for their song and brightly coloured breeding plumage. In 1581, a renaissance scholar named Michel de Montaigne visited Florence where he was able to see these paradise whydahs in the Medici aviaries. He described them with la cue deus longues plumes comme celles d'un chapon which in translation meant "a tail of two long plumes like those of a rooster". Ligozzi, a chief botanical painter of the Medici aviaries, illustrated a painting of the common fig where people later identified that the two birds in the painting were actually the paradise whydah and the indigobird. Other than the beauty, the paradise whydahs can be a nuisance especially for farmers. For instance, in the highlands of Guinea and Sierra Leone, paradise whydahs feed on small seeds of cultivated fonio before they can be harvested, and that also happens to be the first food source available to the human inhabitants after the season of rains.

== Status ==
Widespread throughout its large range, the long-tailed paradise whydah is evaluated as Least Concern on the IUCN Red List of Threatened Species.
