= Robert B. Payne =

Robert Berkeley Payne is an ornithologist, professor and curator at the Museum of Zoology and Department of Ecology and Evolutionary Biology, University of Michigan.

== Academic background ==
Payne had completed his B.S. at the University of Michigan in 1960, and Ph.D. at the University of California (Berkeley) in 1965. He was awarded an NSF postdoctoral fellowship by the University of Cape Town. He was awarded the 2010 Margaret Morse Nice Medal by the Wilson Ornithological Society.

== Fields of study ==
Payne is an expert in behavioral ecology and evolution, bird song and systematics. He has done fieldwork in Africa for 2 years, Western Australia for three years, and in Michigan for 20 years.

== Publications ==
Some notable publications:

- 1983 - A distributional checklist of the birds of Michigan
- 2003 - Museum collections as sources of genetic data
- 2005 - The Cuckoos, Birds Families of the World
- 2005 - The Birds of Africa
