= Bafing National Park =

National park in Mali

- Parc national de Bafing
- IUCN category II (national park)
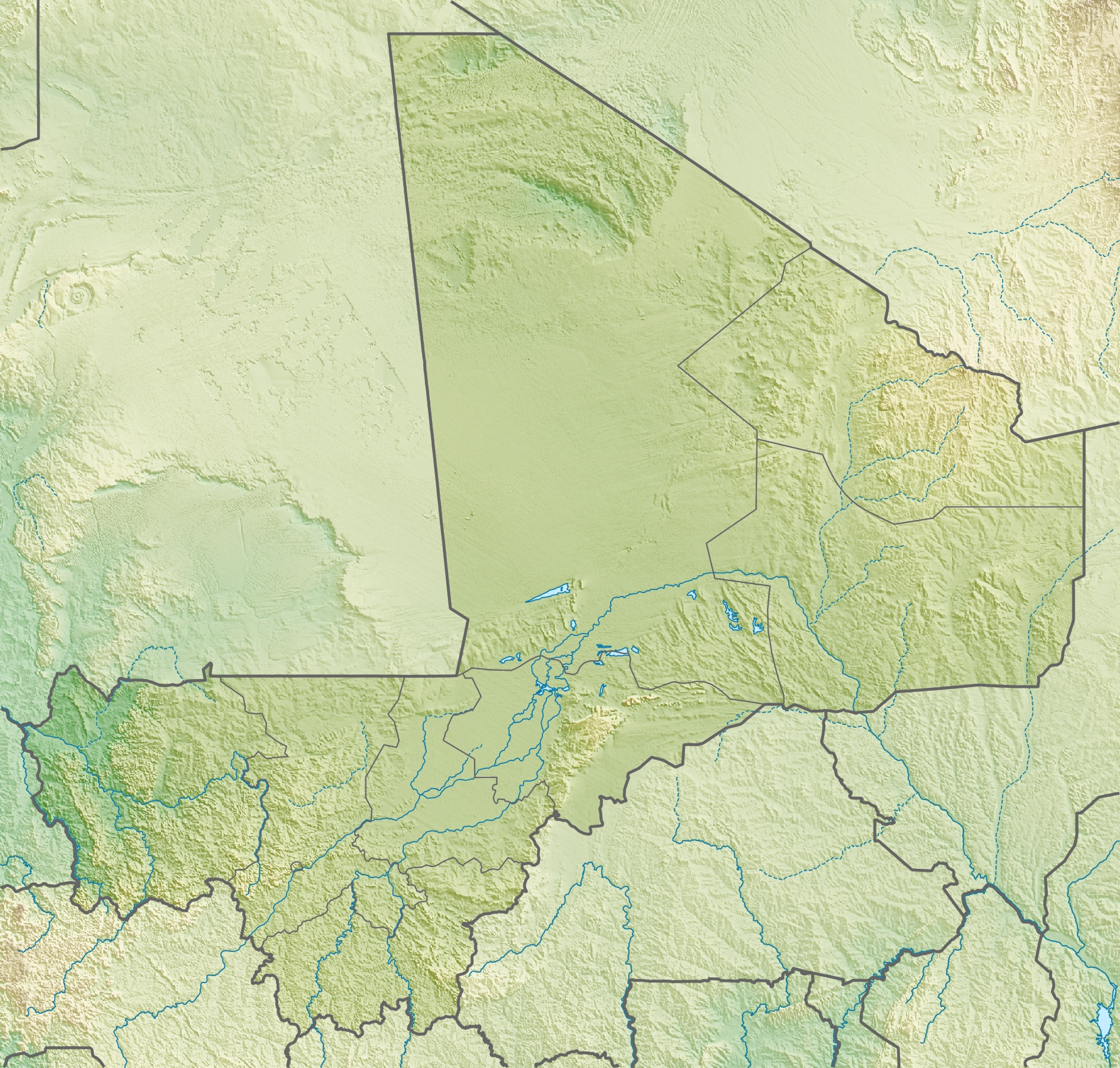
- Location within Mali
- Coordinates: 13°48′N 10°49′W
- Area: 5,000 km^{2} (1,900 sq mi)
- Established: 2000

Bafing National Park (French: Parc national de Bafing) lies in southern Mali. It was established on 1 July 2000. This site covers 5,000 km^{2} (1,900 sq mi). Both Korofin and Wongo National Park (both IUCN category: II) are components of the Bafing Biosphere.

== Environment ==
Woodlands dominate the landscape of the park, which is the only protected area for chimpanzees within the Manding Plateau area. The park has been designated an Important Bird Area (IBA) by BirdLife International because it supports significant populations of violet turacos, blue-bellied rollers, fox kestrels, Senegal parrots, bronze-tailed starlings, white-crowned robin-chats, white-fronted black-chats, Mali and black-faced firefinches, and grey-headed olivebacks.
