= Bafing =

Bafing may refer to:

- Bafing River, which runs through Guinea and Mali
- Bafing Region, region in Ivory Coast
- Bafing National Park, in Mali
