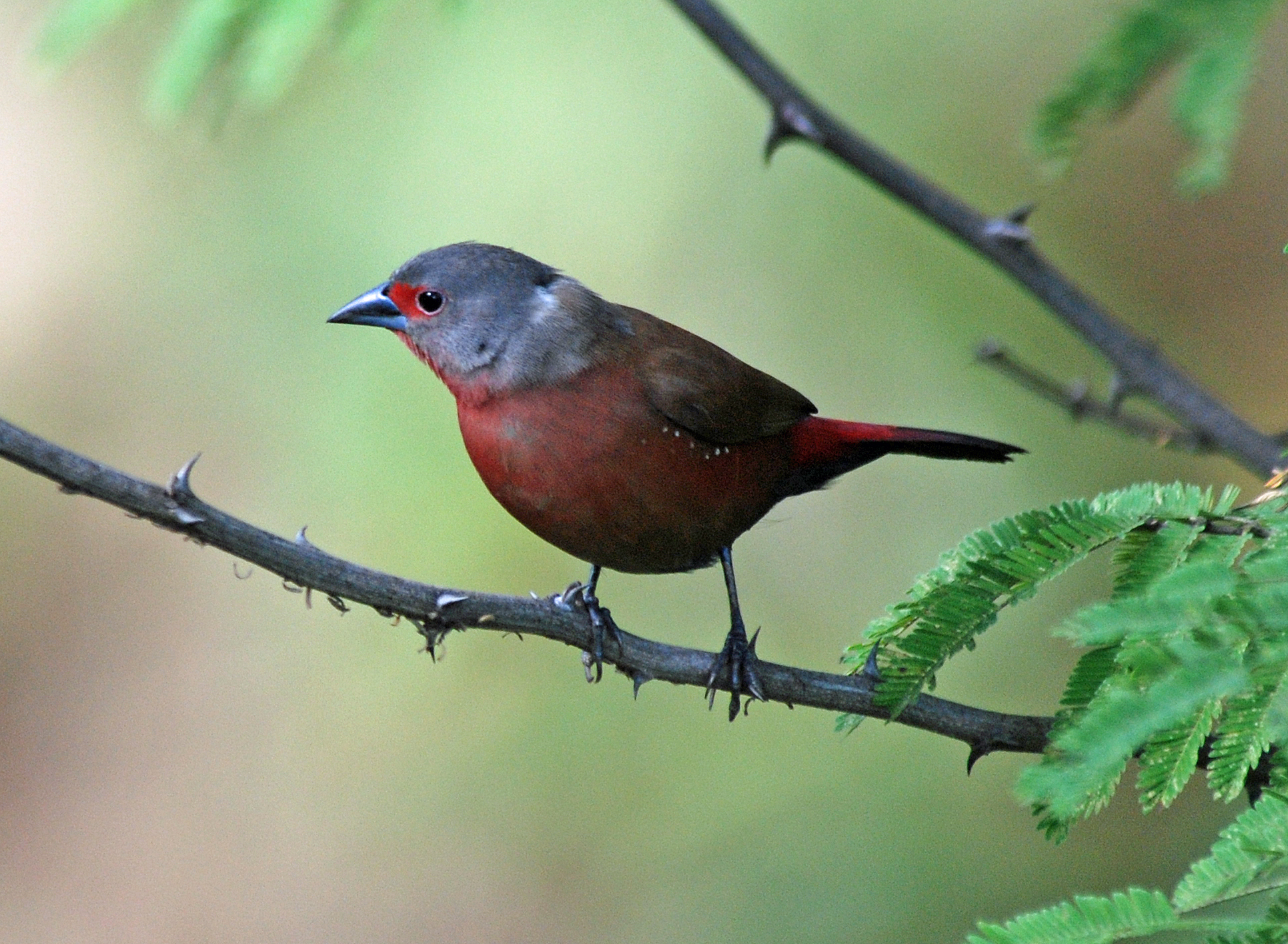

Conservation status
- Least Concern (IUCN 3.1)

Scientific classification
- Kingdom: Animalia
- Phylum: Chordata
- Class: Aves
- Order: Passeriformes
- Family: Estrildidae
- Genus: Lagonosticta
- Species: L. umbrinodorsalis

Binomial name
- Lagonosticta umbrinodorsalis Reichenow, 1910

Synonyms
- Lagonosticta rhodopareia umbrinodorsalis; Lagonosticta bruneli; Lagonosticta rhodopareia bruneli

= Chad firefinch =

Species of bird

The Chad firefinch or Reichenow's firefinch (Lagonosticta umbrinodorsalis) is a small passerine bird belonging to the firefinch genus Lagonosticta in the estrildid finch family Estrildidae. It is restricted to a small area of Central Africa. It was formerly classified as a subspecies of Jameson's firefinch (L. rhodopareia) but is now often treated as a separate species. Its alternative name commemorates Anton Reichenow, the German ornithologist who described this species.

== Description ==
It is 10–11 centimetres long. The male is mostly bright pinkish-red, darker on the upperparts. The crown and nape are grey and the vent is dark. The thick, conical bill is grey and the legs and feet are also grey. Females are similar to males but are slightly duller, paler and browner. Juveniles are brown above and buff below with a pinkish-red rump. The birds have dry, trilling calls.

Jameson's firefinch is similar but lacks the grey crown and nape and does not overlap in range. The rock firefinch (L. sanguinodorsalis) is also similar but has grey only on the crown and its bill has a pale grey patch at the base of the lower mandible.

== Distribution and habitat ==
The bird is endemic to the East Sudanian Savanna ecoregion. It occurs in south-west Chad where it is fairly common and north-east Cameroon where it is rare. It inhabits on grasslands, and rocky hillsides in areas of arid savannah with tall grass.

Little is known about the behaviour of this species. They breed during the wet season. Pairs of birds feed on seeds on the ground.
