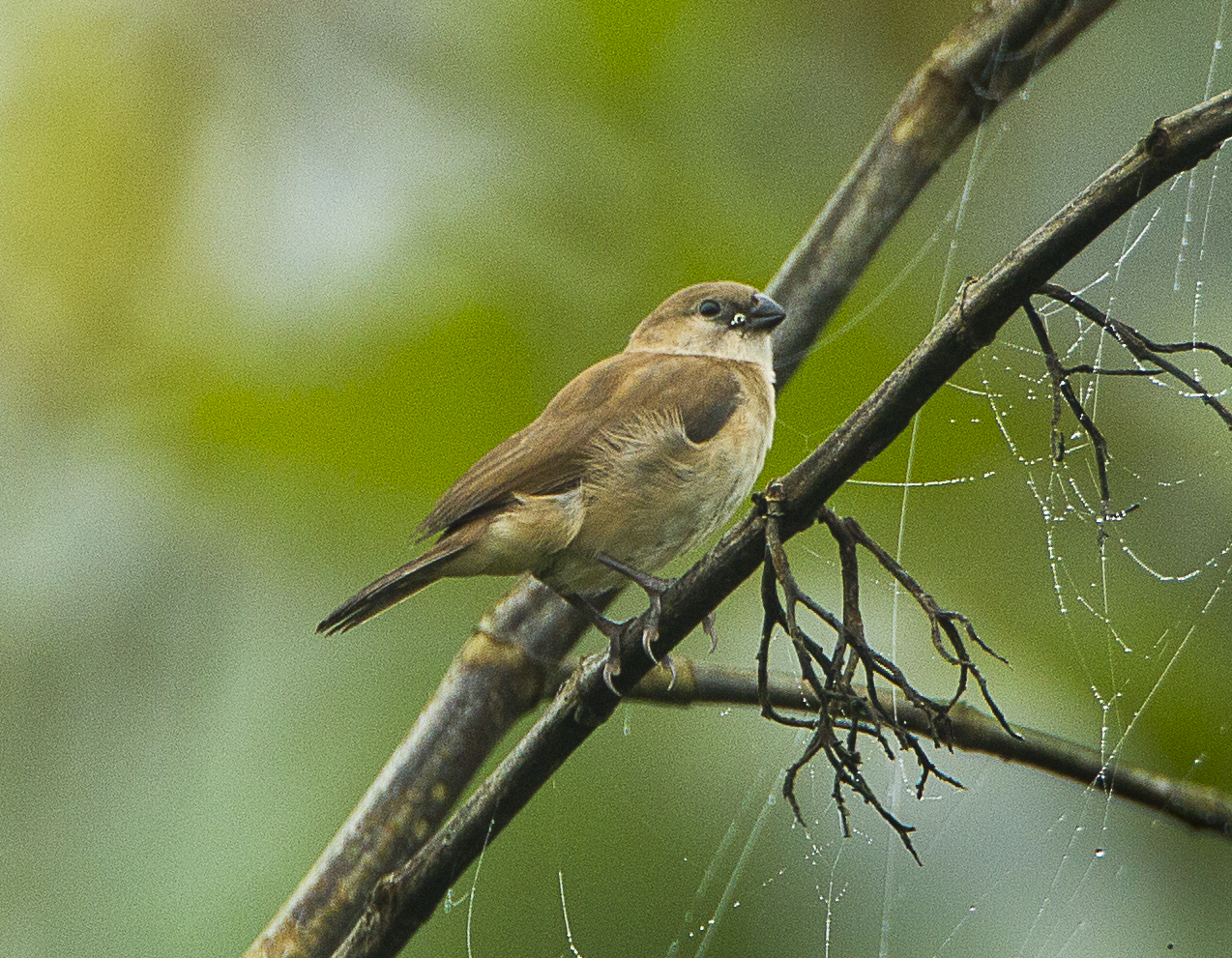
- female

Conservation status
- Least Concern (IUCN 3.1)

Scientific classification
- Kingdom: Animalia
- Phylum: Chordata
- Class: Aves
- Order: Passeriformes
- Family: Estrildidae
- Genus: Lagonosticta
- Species: L. rufopicta

Binomial name
- Lagonosticta rufopicta (Fraser, 1843)

= Bar-breasted firefinch =

Species of bird

The bar-breasted firefinch (Lagonosticta rufopicta) is a common species of estrildid finch found in western and central Africa. It has an estimated global extent of occurrence of 2,900,000 km².

== Description ==
The bar-breasted firefinch with a red head and breast and white barring or speckling on the breast. The forehead, lores and supercilium are deep red fading on the ear coverts, chin, throat and neck sides to less intensely red colour. The crown and most of the upperparts are greyish brown and rather uniform contrasting with deep red lower rump and upper tail coverts. Tail is darker brown than back with variable amounts of red near the base. Flight feathers are dark. The underparts below the crimson breast are buffy grey. Juveniles are much duller with red being confined to the rump and upper tail coverts. 11 cm in length.

== Distribution ==
The bar-breasted firefinch is found from the Gambia and southern Senegal east to western Uganda and eastern Kenya.

== Habitat and habits ==
The bar-breasted firefinch is a common bird of grassland, bush, acacia savanna and forest clearings but will also occur near settlements and in farmland, especially in damp areas. It occurs in pairs and small family parties, but larger flocks will form outside the breeding season and it will join mixed species flocks. It feeds on the ground on small seeds, particularly grass seeds and millet.

== Taxonomy ==
The bar-breasted firefinch forms a superspecies with the brown firefinch Lagnosticta nitidula, and they have been considered to be conspecific. Two subspecies are currently recognized, they are:

- Lagonosticta rufopicta rufopicta (Fraser, 1843): Senegal, Gambia, east to Nigeria, Cameroon, southern Chad and Central African Republic.
- Lagonosticta rufopicta lateritia Heuglin, 1864 – South Sudan, north-eastern Democratic Republic of Congo, western Ethiopia, Uganda and south-western Kenya.
