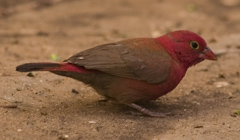
- Red-billed firefinch (Lagonosticta senegala)

Scientific classification
- Kingdom: Animalia
- Phylum: Chordata
- Class: Aves
- Order: Passeriformes
- Family: Estrildidae
- Subfamily: Estrildidae
- Genus: Lagonosticta; Cabanis, 1851

Type species
- Fringilla rubricata M.H.C. Lichtenstein, 1823

Species
- 11, see text

= Firefinch =

Firefinches

Genus of birds

The firefinches form a genus, Lagonosticta, of small seed-eating African birds in the family Estrildidae.

== Taxonomy ==
The genus was introduced by the German ornithologists Jean Cabanis in 1851. The type species was subsequently designated as the African firefinch. The name combines the Ancient Greek words lagōn "flank" and stiktos "spotted". The genus Lagonosticta is sister to the brown twinspot which is placed in its own genus Clytospiza.

== Species ==
The genus contains the following 10 species:

Image	Common name	Scientific name	Distribution
	Red-billed firefinch	Lagonosticta senegala	Democratic Republic of the Congo, Uganda, Kenya, Angola, Zambia, Mozambique, South Africa, Malawi, Nigeria, Senegal, Gambia, Cameroon, Chad, Sudan, Eritrea and Ethiopia
	African firefinch	Lagonosticta rubricata	Senegal east to Ethiopia then south to the Democratic Republic of Congo and Tanzania south through Mozambique to the Eastern Cape province of South Africa.
	Jameson's firefinch	Lagonosticta rhodopareia	Angola, Botswana, Chad, The Democratic Republic of the Congo, Eritrea, Eswatini, Ethiopia, Kenya, Malawi, Mali, Mozambique, Namibia, South Africa, South Sudan, Tanzania, Uganda, Zambia and Zimbabwe
	Mali firefinch	Lagonosticta virata	Western Africa
	Rock firefinch	Lagonosticta sanguinodorsalis	central Nigeria
	Chad firefinch	Lagonosticta umbrinodorsalis	southwest Chad where it is fairly common and northeast Cameroon
	Black-bellied firefinch	Lagonosticta rara	Benin, Burkina Faso, Cameroon, Central African Republic, Chad, The Democratic Republic of the Congo, Côte d'Ivoire, Ghana, Guinea, Kenya, Liberia, Nigeria, Senegal, Sierra Leone, South Sudan, Togo and Uganda
	Bar-breasted firefinch	Lagonosticta rufopicta	Gambia and southern Senegal east to western Uganda and eastern Kenya
	Brown firefinch	Lagonosticta nitidula	Angola, The Democratic Republic of the Congo, Zambia, southern Tanzania and northern areas of Namibia, Botswana and Zimbabwe
	Black-faced firefinch	Lagonosticta larvata	Benin, Burkina Faso, Cameroon, Central African Republic, Chad, The Democratic Republic of the Congo, Côte d'Ivoire, Ethiopia, Gambia, Ghana, Guinea-Bissau, Mali, Niger, Nigeria, Senegal, Sierra Leone, Sudan, Togo and Uganda
