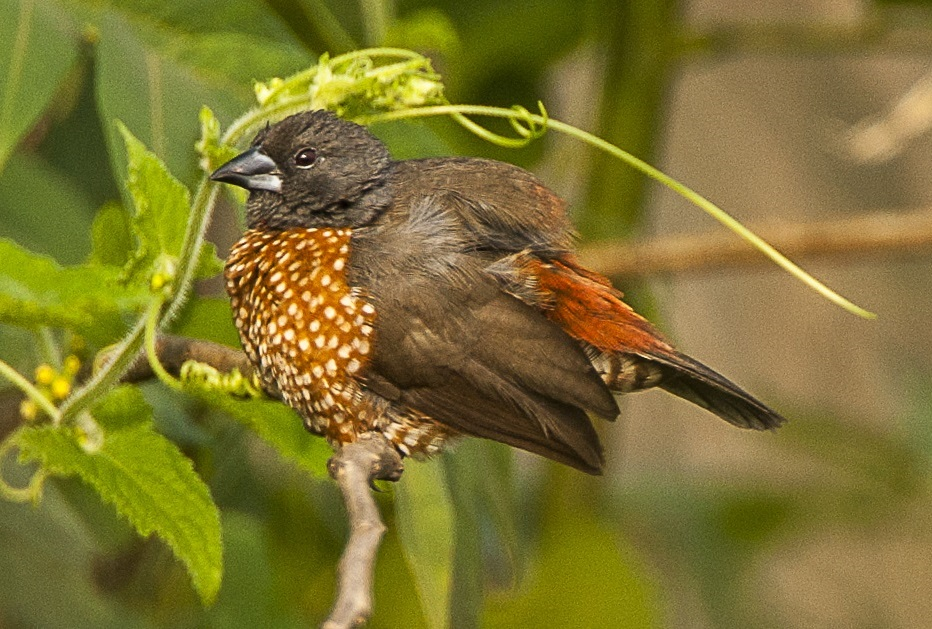

Conservation status
- Least Concern (IUCN 3.1)

Scientific classification
- Kingdom: Animalia
- Phylum: Chordata
- Class: Aves
- Order: Passeriformes
- Family: Estrildidae
- Genus: Clytospiza; Shelley, 1896
- Species: C. monteiri

Binomial name
- Clytospiza monteiri (Hartlaub, 1860)
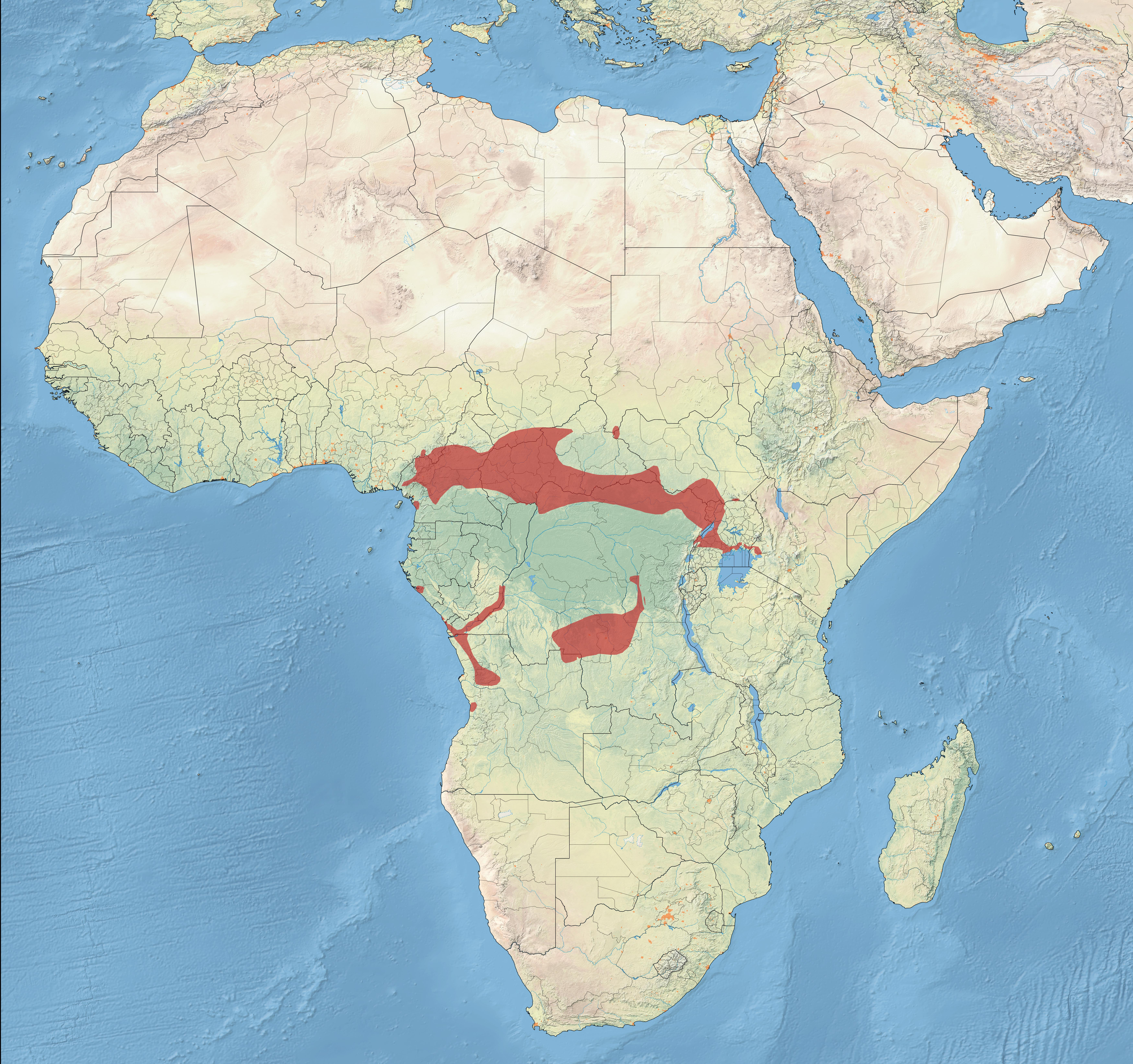
- range

= Brown twinspot =

Species of bird

The brown twinspot (Clytospiza monteiri) is a common species of estrildid finch native to Central Africa. It is the only member of the genus Clytospiza.

It is 12 cm long. Its underparts are sungold with white spots. The females have a white throat rather than red.

It has an estimated global extent of occurrence of 1,200,000 km^{2}. The IUCN has classified the species as being of least concern.

The brown twinspot is sister to the firefinches in the genus Lagonosticta.
