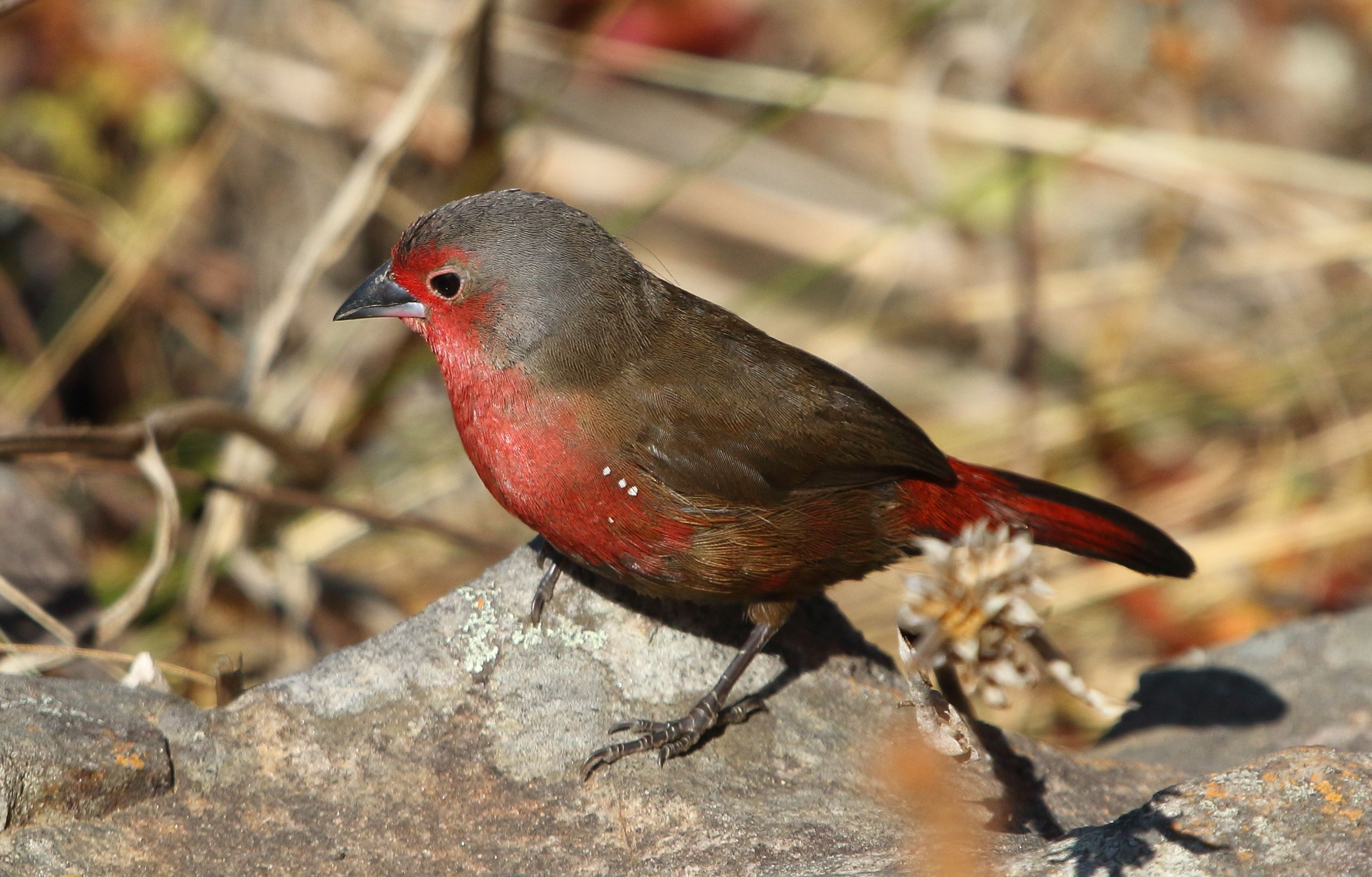
- Male, KwaZulu-Natal

Conservation status
- Least Concern (IUCN 3.1)

Scientific classification
- Kingdom: Animalia
- Phylum: Chordata
- Class: Aves
- Order: Passeriformes
- Family: Estrildidae
- Genus: Lagonosticta
- Species: L. rubricata

Binomial name
- Lagonosticta rubricata (Lichtenstein, MHC, 1823)

= African firefinch =

Species of bird

The African firefinch (Lagonosticta rubricata), also called the blue-billed firefinch, is a common species of estrildid finch found in many parts of Africa. It has an estimated global extent of occurrence of 5,400,000 km^{2} (2,100,000 mi^{2}).

== Taxonomy ==
The African firefinch was formally described in 1823 by the German naturalist Hinrich Lichtenstein. He placed it with the finches in the genus Fringilla and coined the binomial name Fringilla rubricata. Lichtenstein gave the locality as "terra Caffrorum". This has been restricted to the town of Uitenhage in the Eastern Cape Province of South Africa. The specific epithet rubricata is from Latin rubricatus meaning "orange-red" or "ruddy". The African firefinch is now placed in the genus Lagonosticta that was introduced in 1851 by Jean Cabanis. An alternative common name for this species is the blue-billed firefinch.

Five subspecies are recognised.

- L. r. polionota Shelley, 1873 – south Senegal to Nigeria
- L. r. congica Sharpe, 1890 – Cameroon to south Sudan, west Uganda, south, east DR Congo and north Angola
- L. r. haematocephala Neumann, 1907 – east Sudan, Ethiopia, central, south Uganda, west, central Kenya south to Zambia, Malawi, east Zimbabwe, east Tanzania and north, central Mozambique
- L. r. landanae Sharpe, 1890 – Gabon to west DR Congo and northwest Angola
- L. r. rubricata (Lichtenstein, MHC, 1823) – south Mozambique and north, east South Africa

The subspecies L. r. landanae has sometimes been treated as a separate species with the common name as either the Landana firefinch or the pale-billed firefinch. It differs from the other subspecies mainly in the bill colour but its plumage is very close to that of L. r. haematocephala.

== Description ==
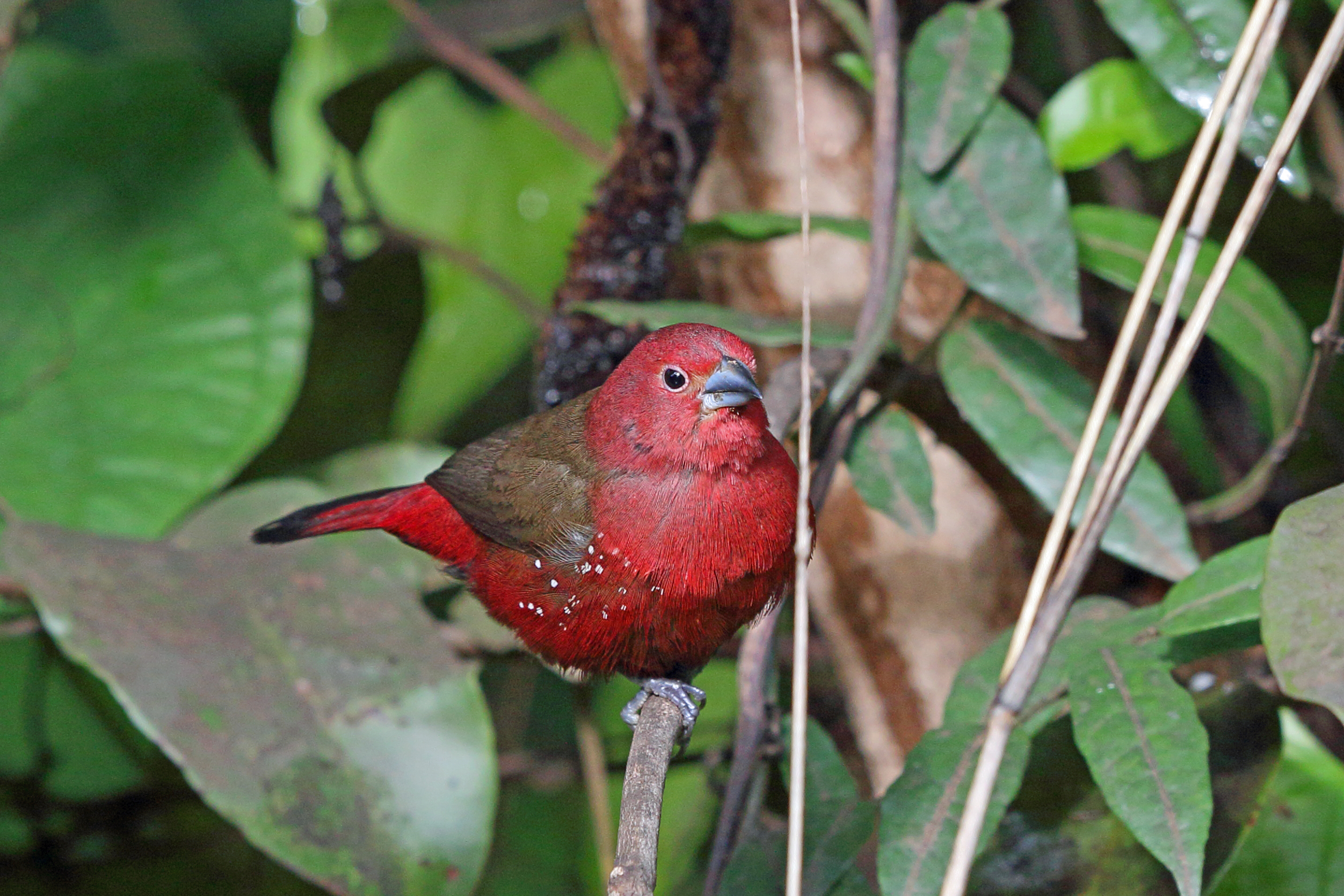
Male African firefinch ssp. L. r. haematocephala. Sakania, The Democratic Republic of the Congo

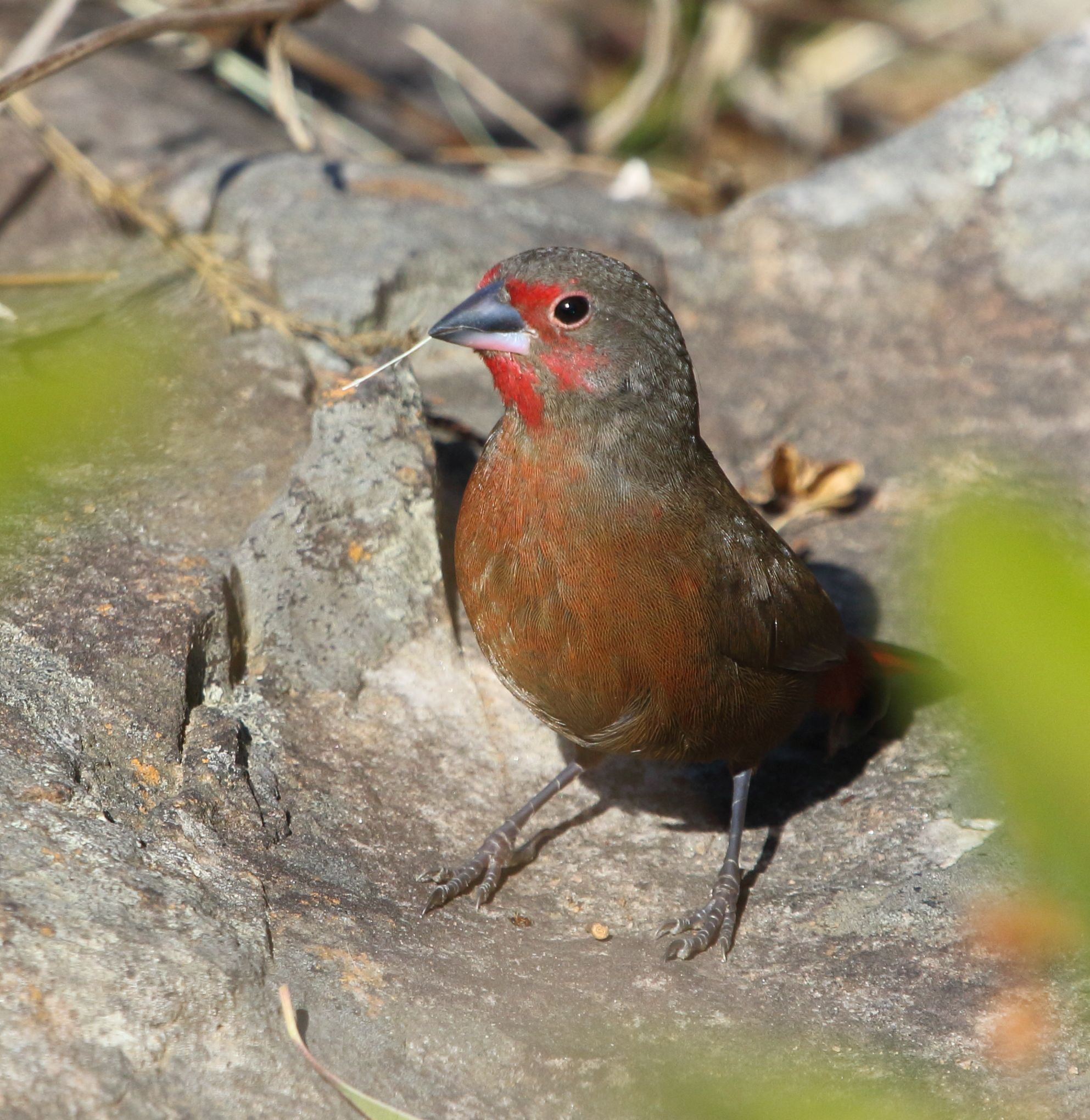
Female African firefinch ssp. L. r. rubricata. KwaZulu-Natal

The African firefinch is a small red or red and brown species of estrildid finch. The male has a lead grey crown, nape and neck, merging on to an olive brown mantles with the scapulars, wing coverts and tertials also olive brown, sometimes with a grey tinge. The rump, uppertail coverts, outer tail feathers are deep carmine red, the rest of the tail is black. The underparts from the chin to the belly are deep scarlet, with small white spots on the upper breast and flanks, the scarlet of the flanks continues to the side of the rump. The centre of the belly is greyish becoming black on the vent and the undertail coverts. the short, pointed bill is blackish-grey with a pink base to the lower mandible. The female is similar to the male but is less intensely coloured; juveniles lack any red on the underparts. The African firefinch measures 10–11 cm (3.9–4.3 in) in length and weighs 8.6–11.7 g (0.30–0.41 oz).

=== Voice ===
The song, which is given by both sexes, is made up of various ringing notes which are randomly repeated and interspersed with squeaky whistle, trills and warbles. The alarm call is a harsh ticking which resembles the call of the Eurasian wren. More usual calls are rising trilling twitter " trrrrrrrr-t" and a loud clear "tui-tui-tui-tui", which is often followed by "wink-wink-wink".

== Distribution and habitat ==
The African firefinch occurs in patches across sub-Saharan Africa, from Senegal east to Ethiopia then south to the southern Democratic Republic of Congo and Tanzania south through Mozambique to the Eastern Cape province of South Africa.

It generally prefers humid, thickly vegetated habitats such as bracken Pteridium aquilinum at forest edges, savanna with acacia woodland, rank grass within and belowscrub or thornbush, along streams and rivers with thick vegetation, often near quiet paths or roads. The African firefinch can also be seen in and around gardens and rural villages but not as commonly as some other firefinch species.

== Behaviour ==
=== Food and feeding ===
The African firefinch mainly feeds on seeds which are supplemented with insects, it mostly forages on the ground, searching through the soil looking for food. It occurs in pairs or small family parties and may mix with other firefinches, staying close to cover and retreating quickly into the cover if alarmed.

=== Breeding ===
The male builds the nest, which is a round structure with a side entrance, the outer shell consists of long, dry grass blades and there is an inner shell of soft grass inflorescences, this is sometimes lined with feathers. The nest is typically hidden deep in long, thick grass, bracken-briar undergrowth or in grass growing among fallen branches or tree stumps. The 2-5 eggs are laid, in southern Africa, from November–June, with a peak from January–April, further north it breeds later in the year. Both sexes incubate the eggs, incubation lasting about 12 days, once hatched the chicks are fed both parents for 2–3 weeks up to fledging, after which they are fed for 10 more days at which point they become fully independent. The dusky indigobird is a brood parasite of the African firefinch.
