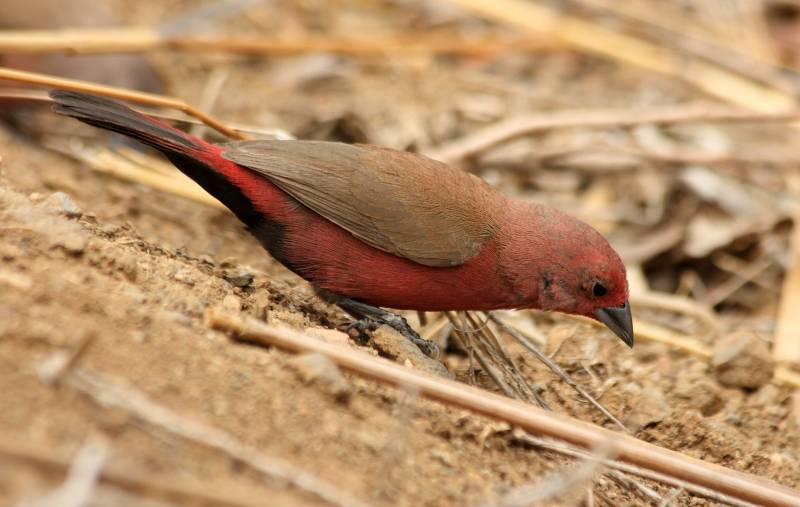

Conservation status
- Least Concern (IUCN 3.1)

Scientific classification
- Kingdom: Animalia
- Phylum: Chordata
- Class: Aves
- Order: Passeriformes
- Family: Estrildidae
- Genus: Lagonosticta
- Species: L. rhodopareia

Binomial name
- Lagonosticta rhodopareia (Heuglin, 1868)

= Jameson's firefinch =

Species of bird

Jameson's firefinch (Lagonosticta rhodopareia) is a common species of estrildid finch, sparsely spread across sub-Saharan Africa. It has an estimated global extent of occurrence of 2,600,000 km^{2}.

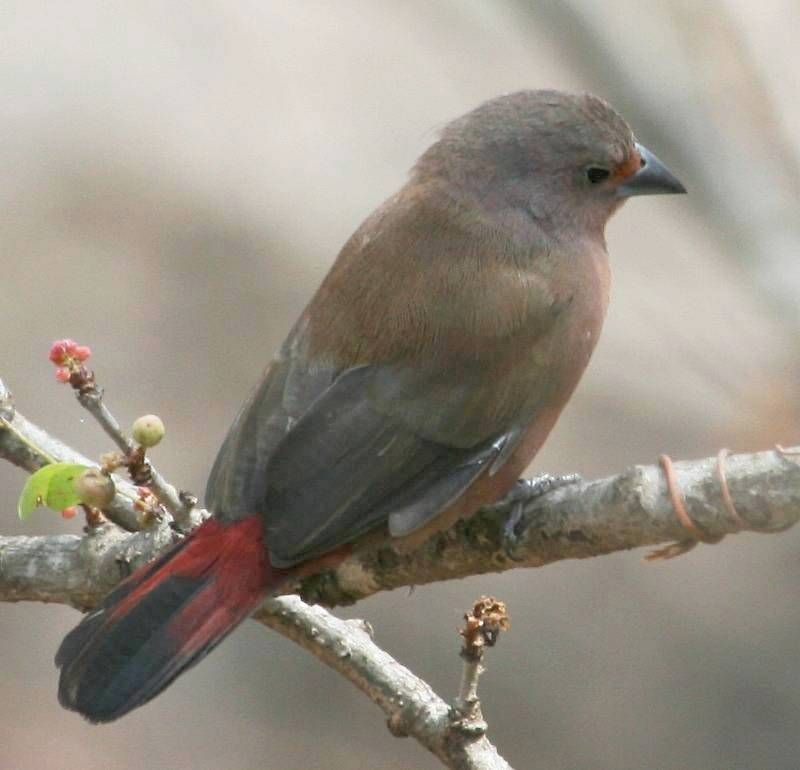
A female in Kruger National Park, South Africa
