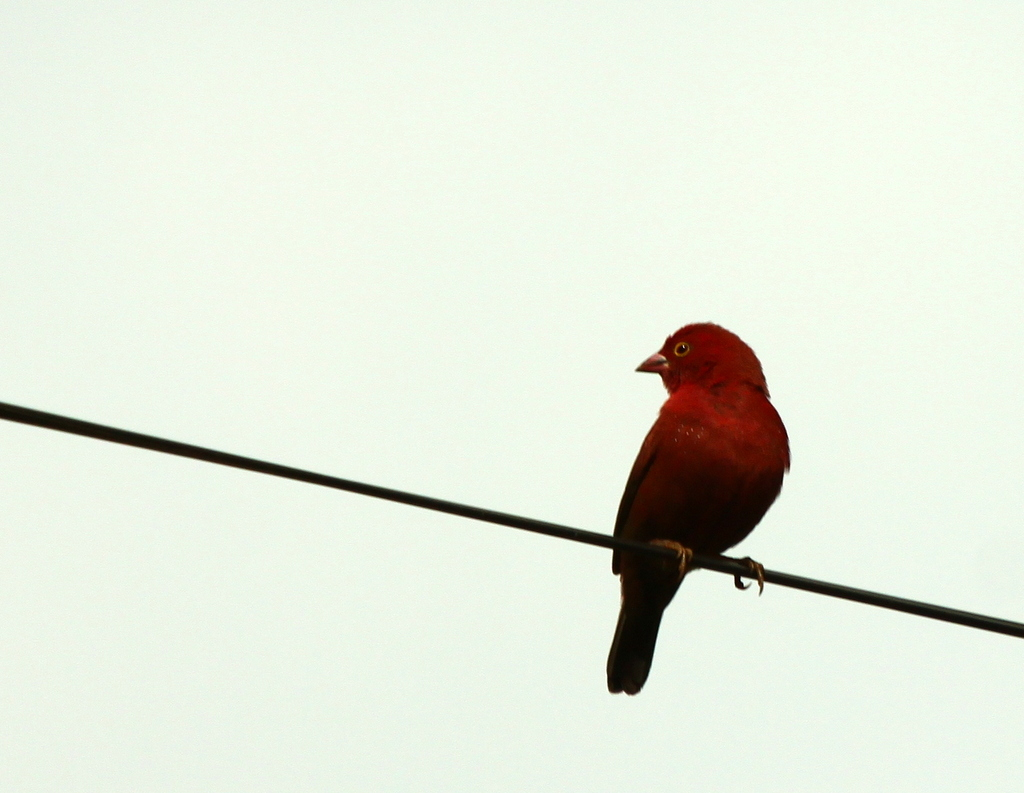

Conservation status
- Least Concern (IUCN 3.1)

Scientific classification
- Kingdom: Animalia
- Phylum: Chordata
- Class: Aves
- Order: Passeriformes
- Family: Estrildidae
- Genus: Lagonosticta
- Species: L. rara

Binomial name
- Lagonosticta rara (Antinori, 1864)

= Black-bellied firefinch =

Species of bird

The black-bellied firefinch (Lagonosticta rara) is a common species of estrildid finch found in Africa.

It is native to the Guinean forest–savanna mosaic, the southern Sahel and northern Sudan (region). It has an estimated global extent of occurrence of 2,300,000 km^{2}.

The status of the species is evaluated as Least Concern.
