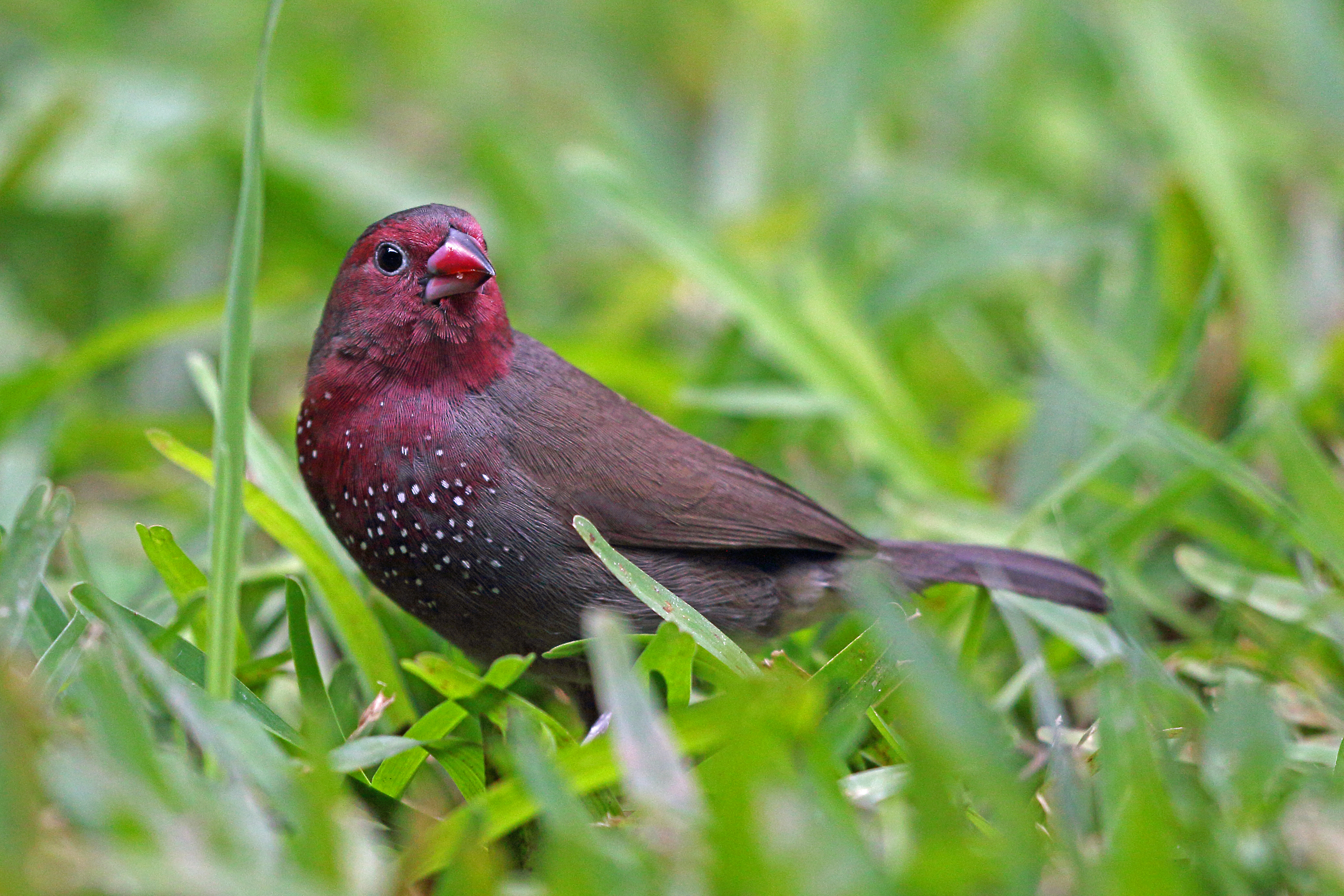

Conservation status
- Least Concern (IUCN 3.1)

Scientific classification
- Kingdom: Animalia
- Phylum: Chordata
- Class: Aves
- Order: Passeriformes
- Family: Estrildidae
- Genus: Lagonosticta
- Species: L. nitidula

Binomial name
- Lagonosticta nitidula Hartlaub, 1886

= Brown firefinch =

Species of bird

The brown firefinch (Lagonosticta nitidula) is a common species of estrildid finch found in Southern Africa. It has an estimated global extent of occurrence of 1,300,000 km^{2}.

It is found in Angola, The Democratic Republic of the Congo, Zambia, southern Tanzania and northern areas of Namibia, Botswana and Zimbabwe. The IUCN has classified the species as being of least concern.
