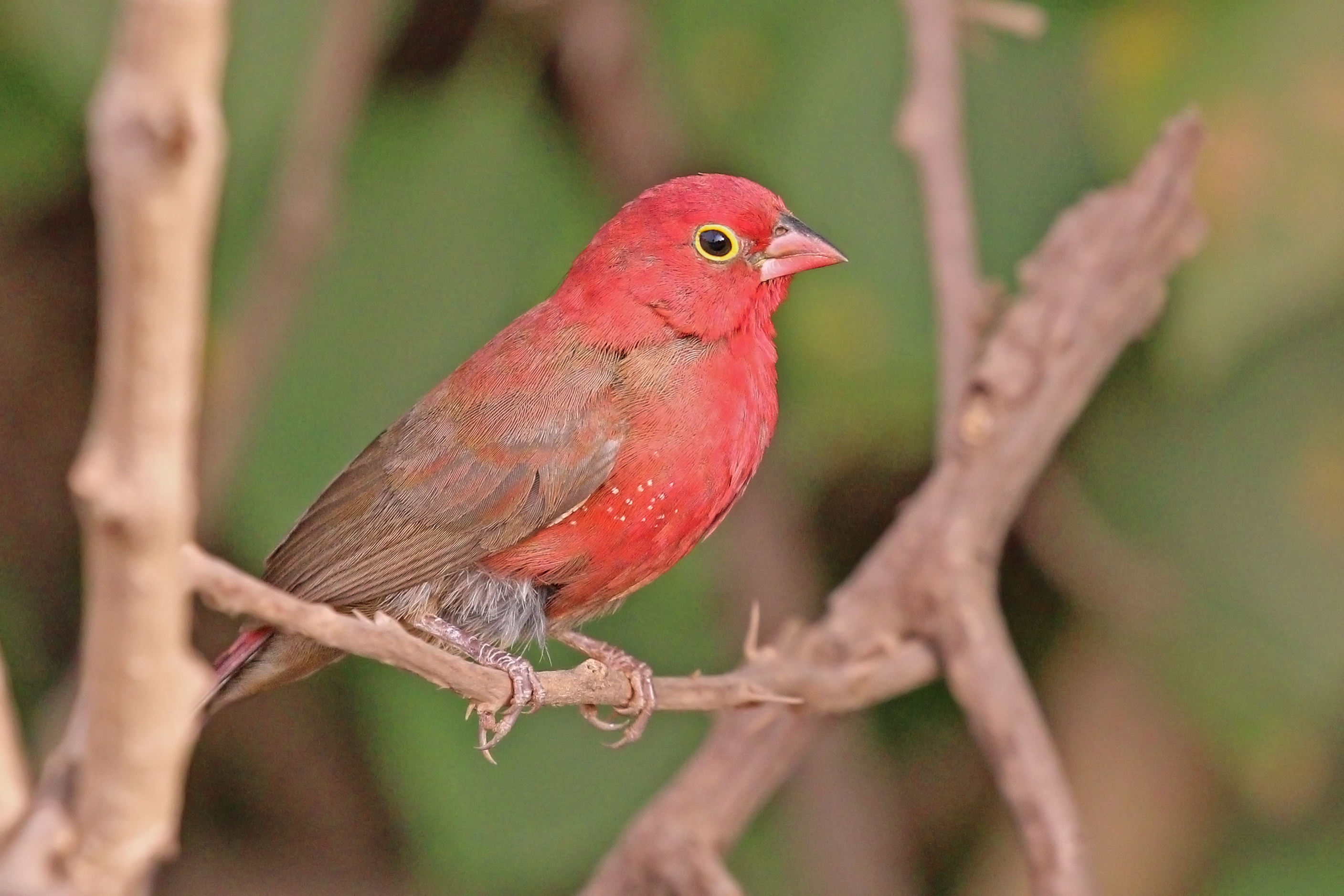

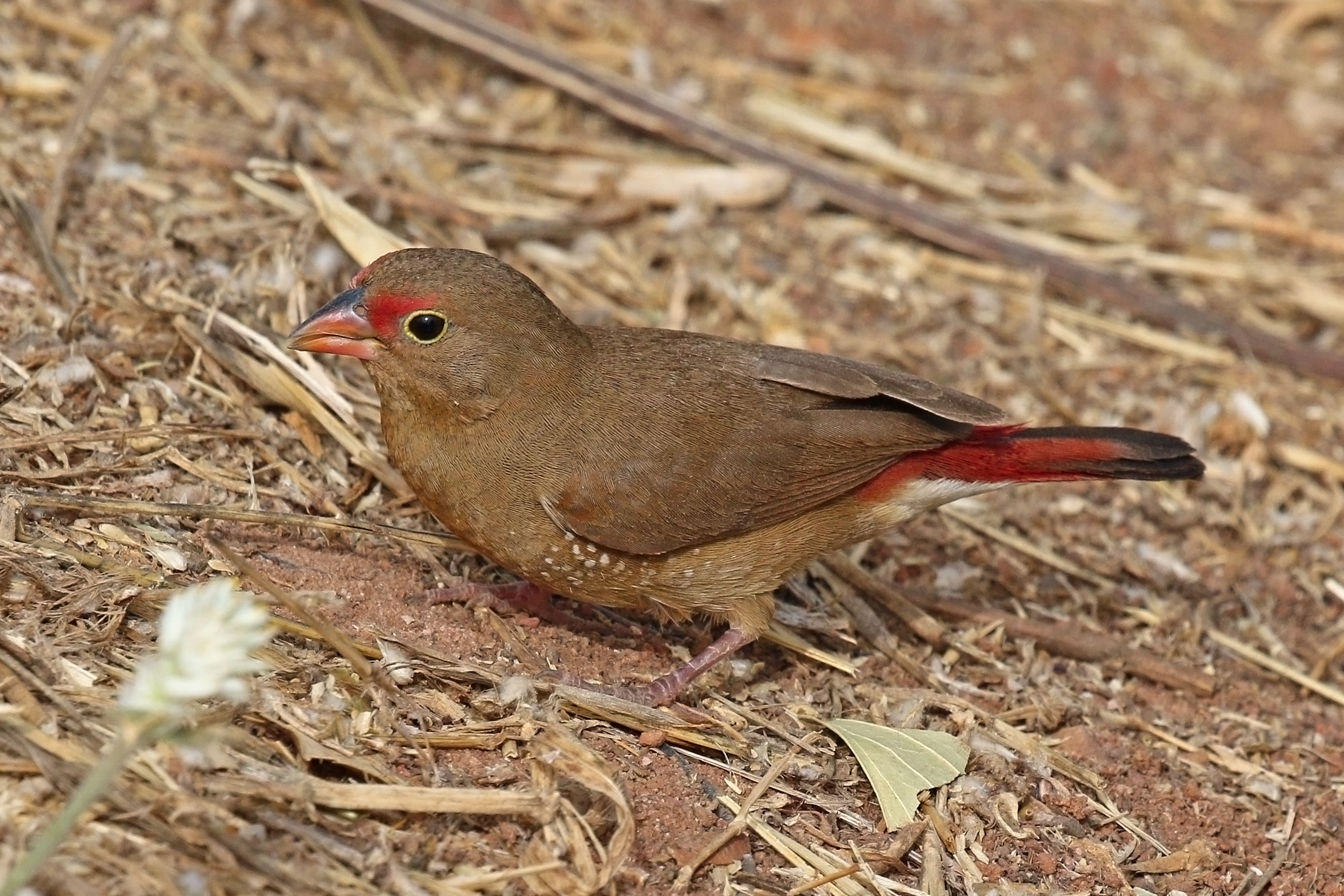
- Male and female of the nominate subspecies, both in The Gambia

Conservation status
- Least Concern (IUCN 3.1)

Scientific classification
- Kingdom: Animalia
- Phylum: Chordata
- Class: Aves
- Order: Passeriformes
- Family: Estrildidae
- Genus: Lagonosticta
- Species: L. senegala

Binomial name
- Lagonosticta senegala (Linnaeus, 1766)

Synonyms
- Fringilla senegala Linnaeus, 1766

= Red-billed firefinch =

Species of bird

The red-billed firefinch or Senegal firefinch (Lagonosticta senegala) is a small seed-eating bird in the family Estrildidae. This is a resident breeding bird in most of Sub-Saharan Africa with an estimated global extent of occurrence of 10,000,000 km^{2}. It was introduced to Egypt, but the population there has become extinct. It was also introduced to southern Algeria where it is currently expanding northward.

== Taxonomy ==
In 1760 the French zoologist Mathurin Jacques Brisson included a description of the red-billed firefinch in his Ornithologie based on a specimen collected in Senegal. He used the French name Le Sénégali rouge and the Latin name Senegalus Ruber. Although Brisson coined Latin names, these do not conform to the binomial system and are not recognised by the International Commission on Zoological Nomenclature. When in 1766 the Swedish naturalist Carl Linnaeus updated his Systema Naturae for the twelfth edition, he added 240 species that had been previously described by Brisson. One of these was the red-billed firefinch. Linnaeus included a brief description, coined the binomial name Fringilla senegala and cited Brisson's work. The species is now placed in the genus Lagonosticta that was introduced by the German ornithologists Jean Cabanis in 1851.

There are six subspecies:

- L. s. senegala (Linnaeus, 1766) – Nominate subspecies – Mauritania, Senegal and Gambia to west and central Nigeria
- L. s. rhodopsis (Heuglin, 1863) – Sahel red-billed firefinch or Adamawa red-billed firefinch – east Nigeria, north and central Cameroon and south Chad to Sudan, west Eritrea and west Ethiopia
- L. s. brunneiceps Sharpe, 1890 – Abyssinian red-billed firefinch – central Ethiopia and southeast Sudan
- L. s. somaliensis Salvadori, 1894 – Lake Abaya red-billed firefinch or Somali red-billed firefinch – southeast Ethiopia and south Somalia
- L. s. ruberrima Reichenow, 1903 – Uganda red-billed firefinch – Democratic Republic of the Congo, Uganda and west Kenya to northeast Angola, northeast Zambia and north Malawi
- L. s. rendalli Hartert, 1898 – Southern red-billed firefinch – south Angola to Mozambique south to South Africa

== Description ==
The red-billed firefinch is 10 cm (3.9 in) in length. The adult male has entirely scarlet plumage apart from brown wings. The bill is pink, and there is a yellow eye-ring. Females have uniformly brown upperparts and buff underparts. There is a small red patch in front of both eyes, with the bill also being pink.

== Range and habitat ==
This widespread and abundant species is often found around human habitation, often with other species such as the red-cheeked cordon-bleu. Its soft queet-queet call is a familiar African sound. The song is a rising chick-pea-pea-pea.

The red-billed firefinch is a small gregarious bird which feeds mainly on grain and other seeds. It frequents open grassland and cultivation. The nest is a large domed grass structure with a side entrance, built low in a bush, wall or thatch into which three to six white eggs are laid. The nest of this species is parasitised by the village indigobird.

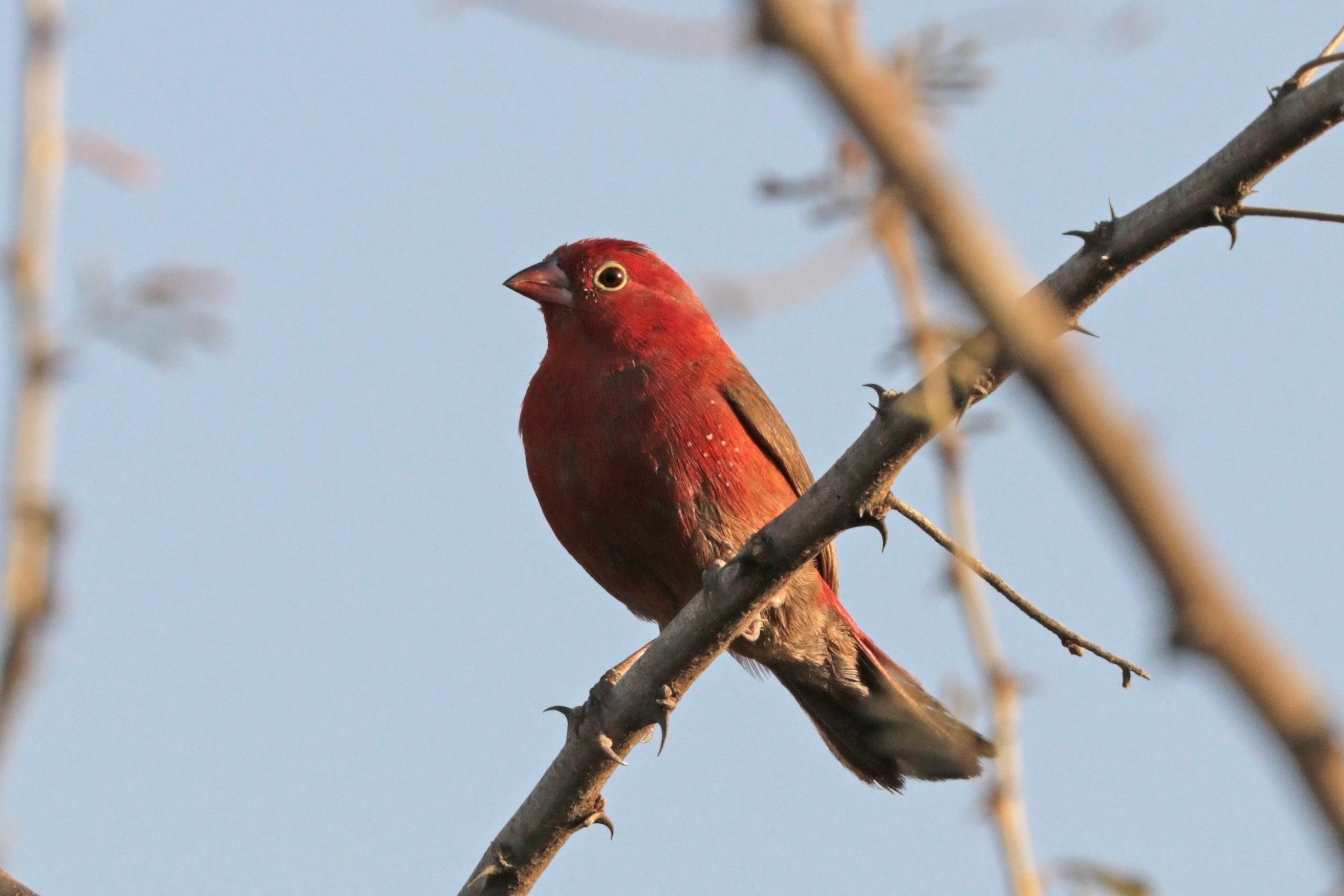
male L. s. brunneiceps, Ethiopia

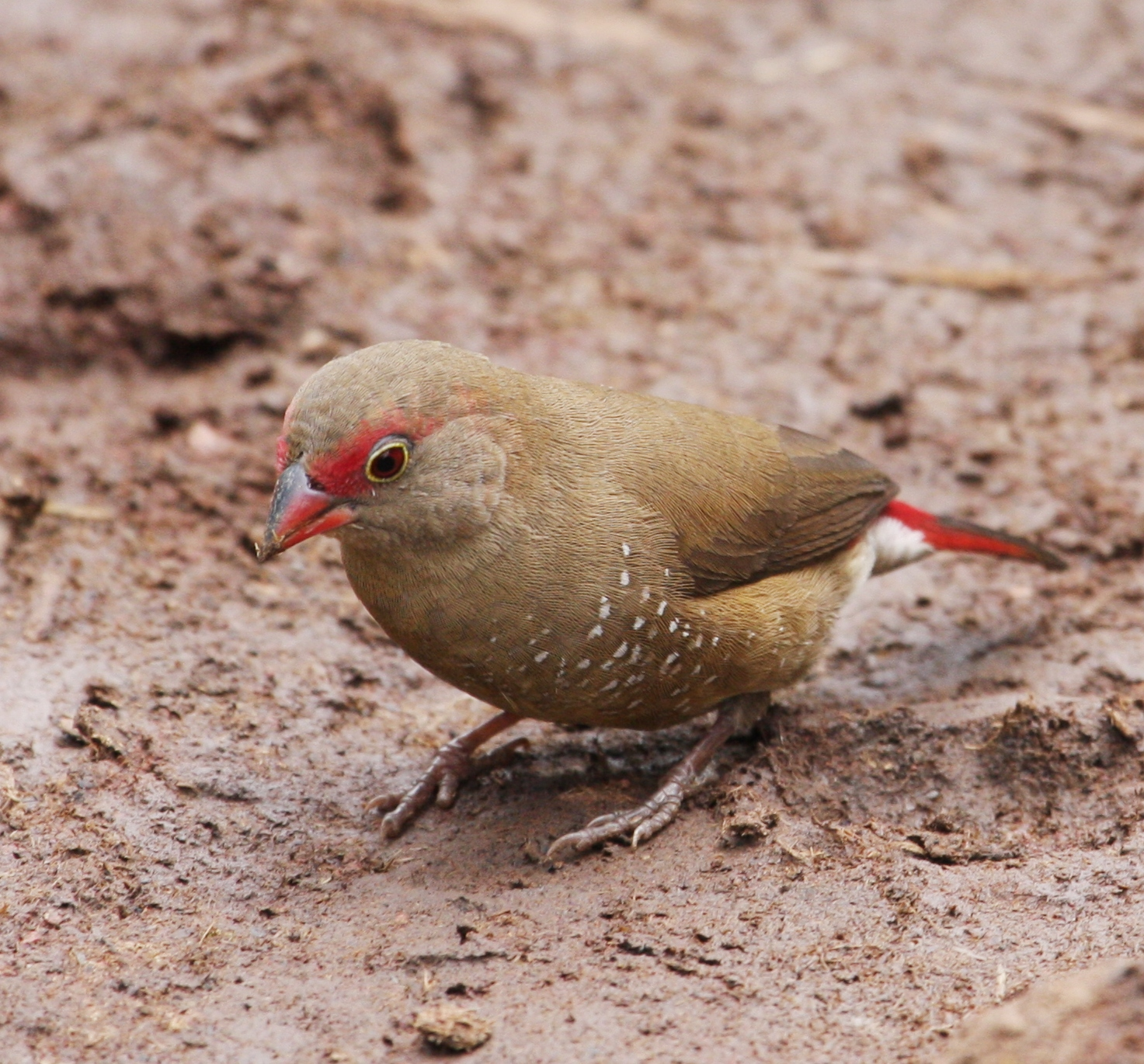
female L. s. brunneiceps, Ethiopia

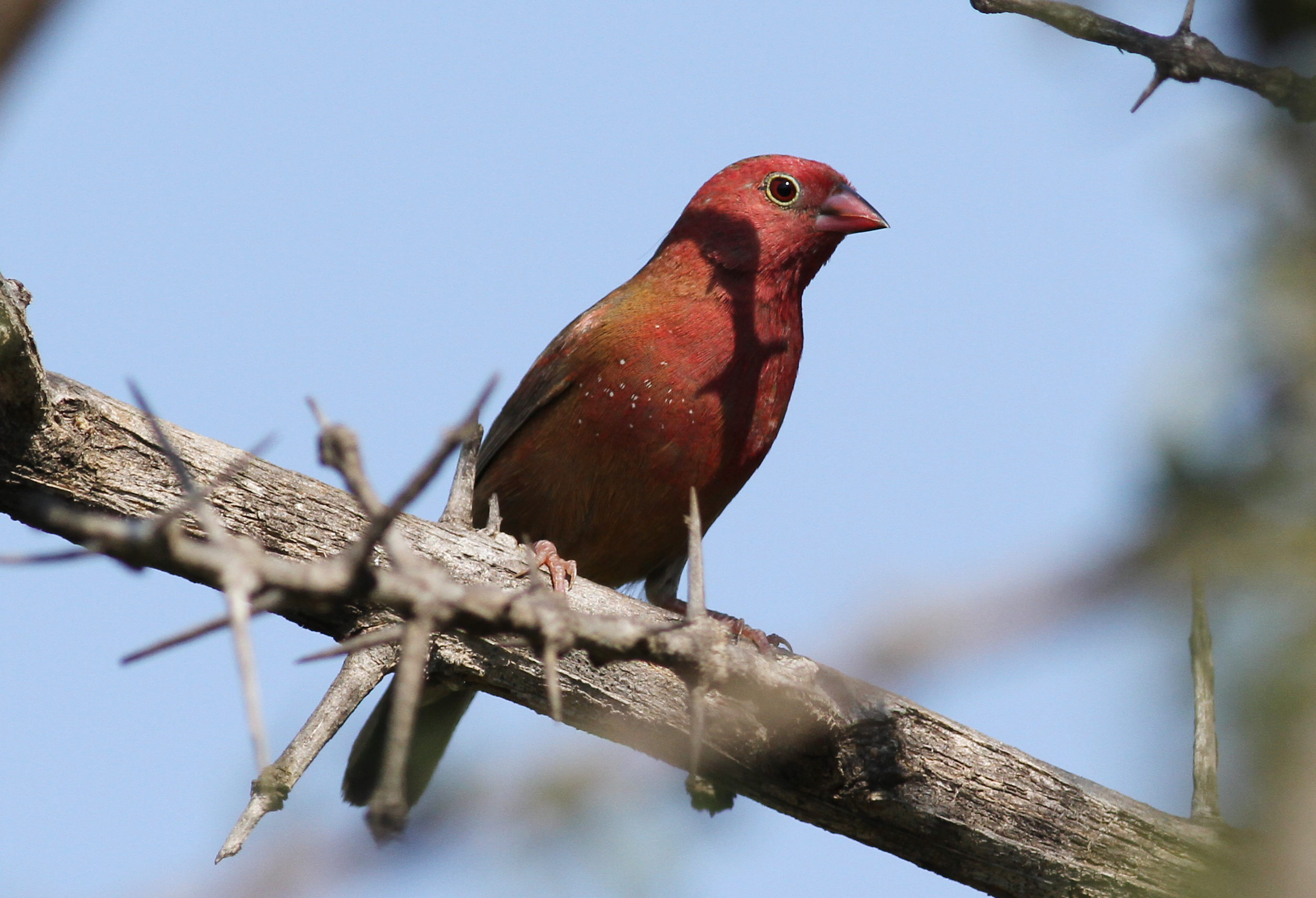
male L. s. rendalli
South Africa

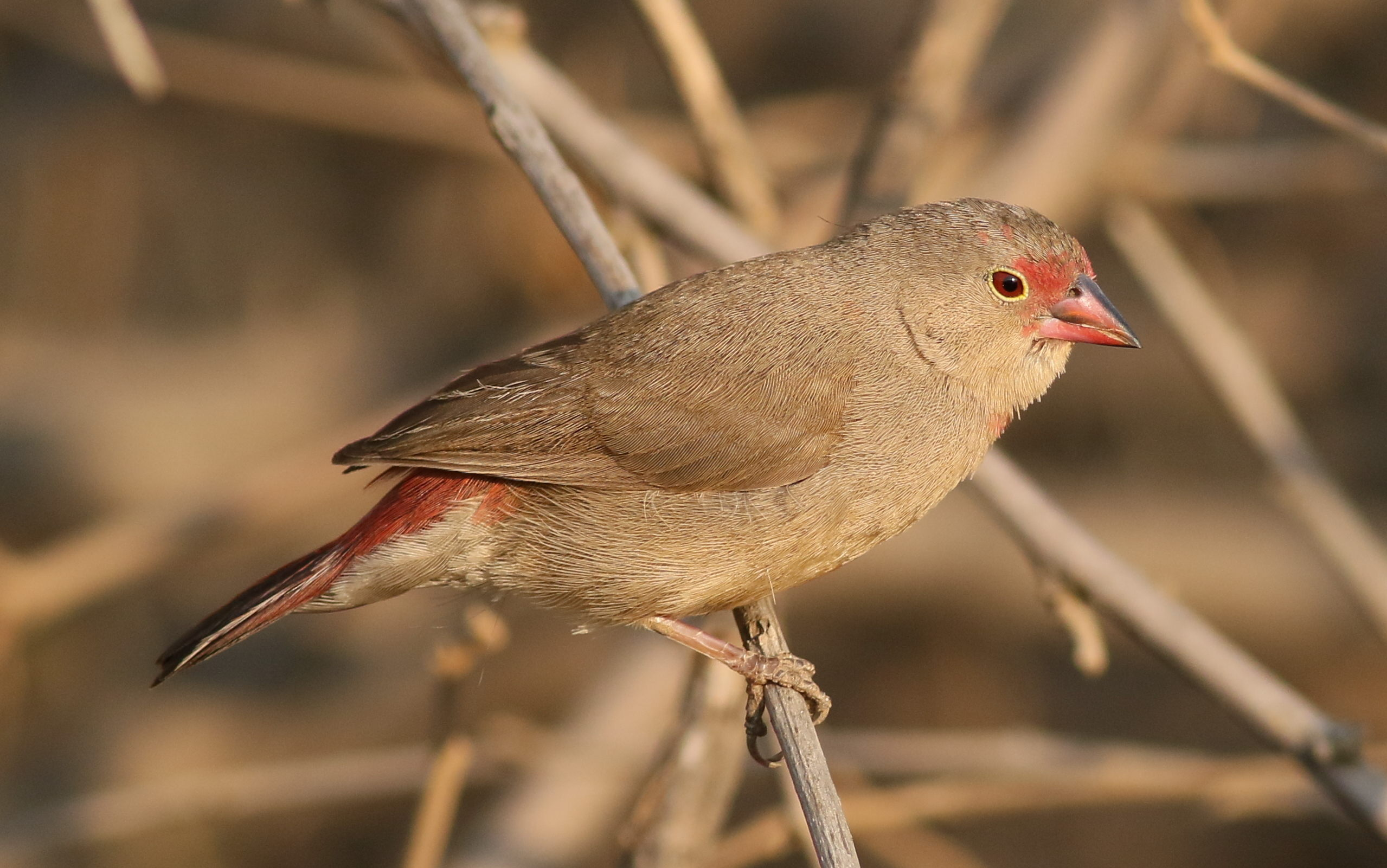
juvenile L. s. rendalli
South Africa

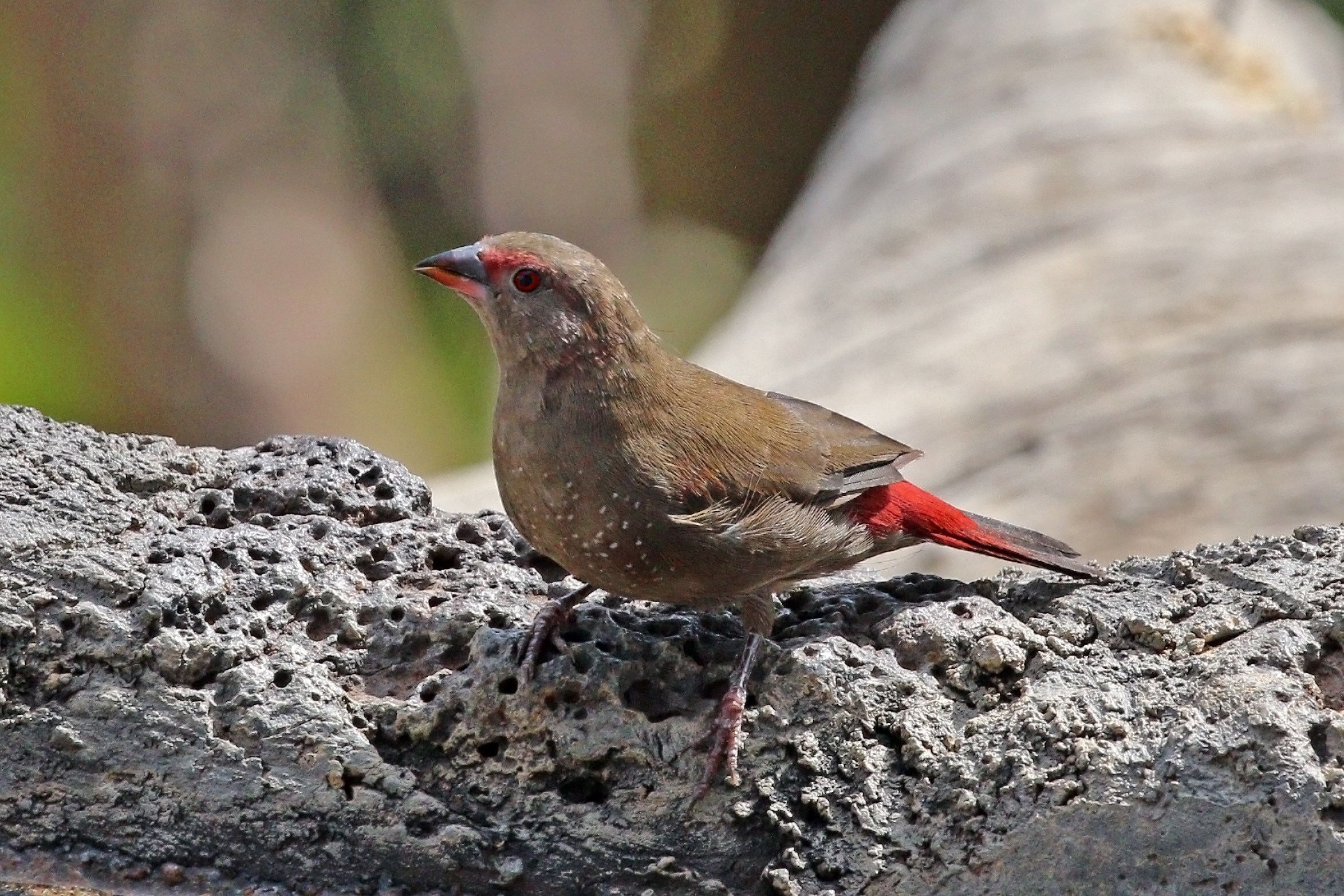
female L. s. ruberrima
Lake Baringo, Kenya

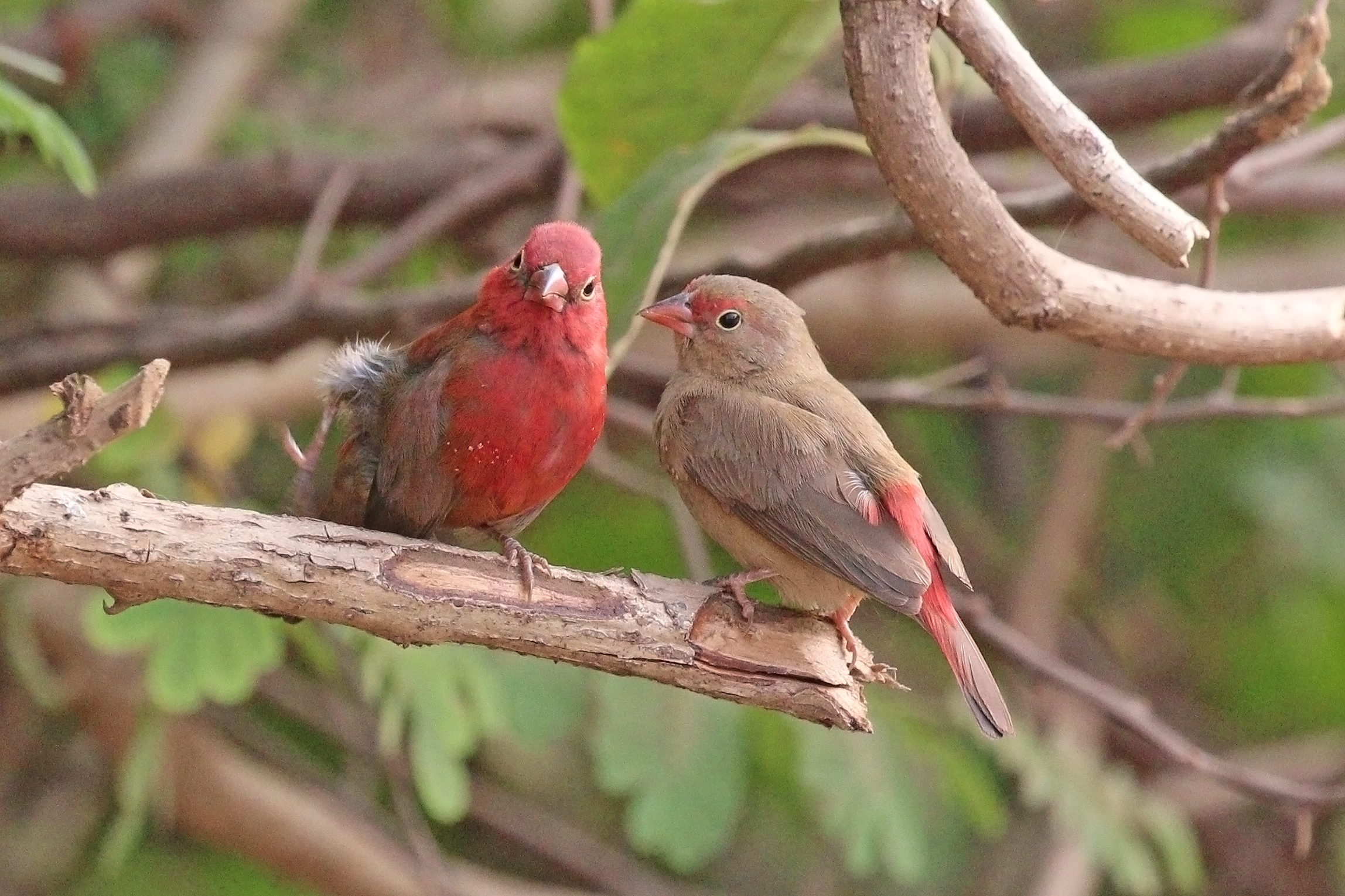
pair of L. s. senegala, Gambia
