= Mali firefinch =

Conservation status
- Least Concern (IUCN 3.1)

Scientific classification
- Kingdom: Animalia
- Phylum: Chordata
- Class: Aves
- Order: Passeriformes
- Family: Estrildidae
- Genus: Lagonosticta
- Species: L. virata

Binomial name
- Lagonosticta virata Bates, 1932

Species of bird

The Mali firefinch (Lagonosticta virata) is a species of estrildid finch found in Western Africa. It has an estimated global extent of occurrence of 120,000 km^{2}. It is found in Mali and Senegal. The IUCN has classified the species as being of least concern. It is also the mascot of Mali.
