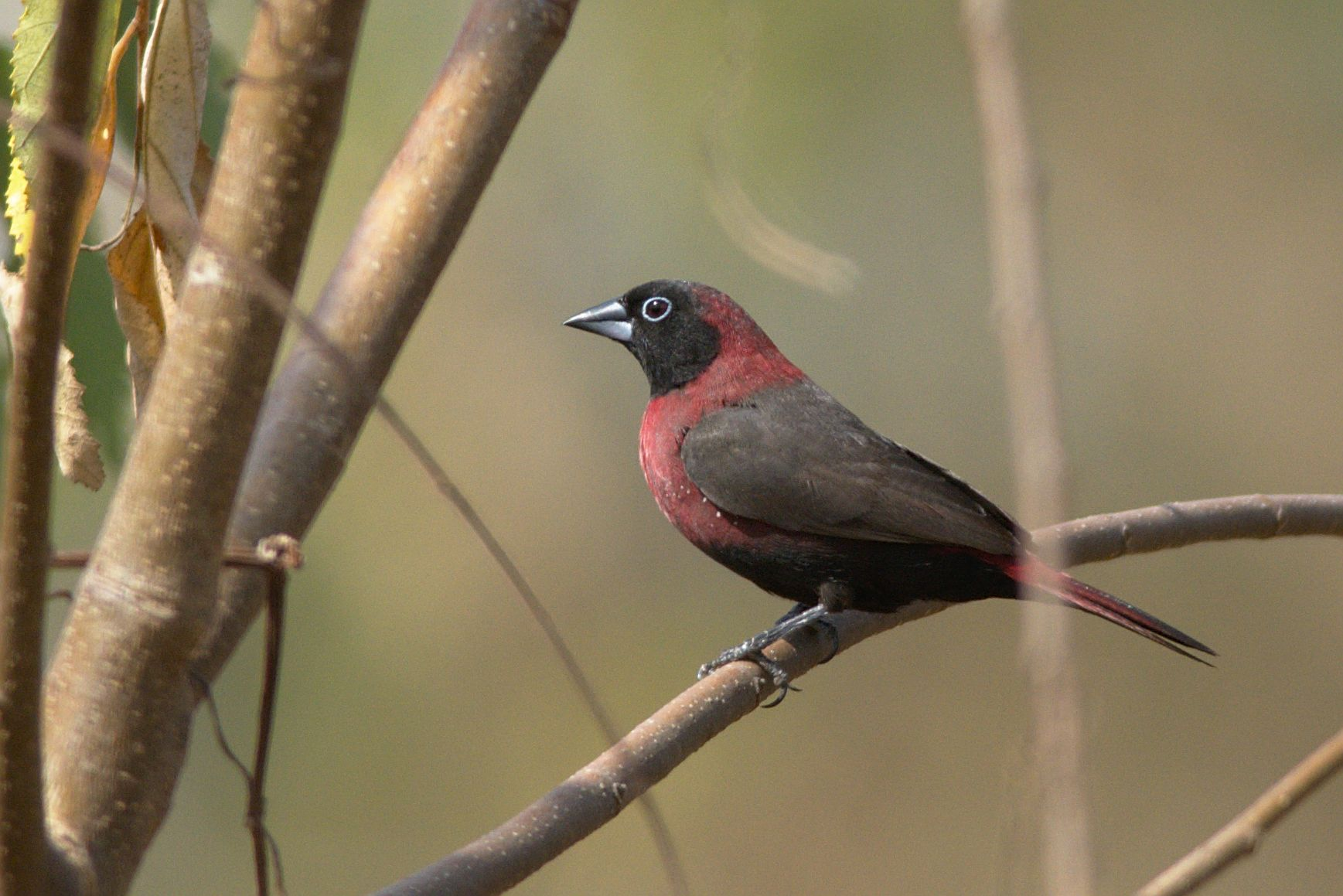

Conservation status
- Least Concern (IUCN 3.1)

Scientific classification
- Kingdom: Animalia
- Phylum: Chordata
- Class: Aves
- Order: Passeriformes
- Family: Estrildidae
- Genus: Lagonosticta
- Species: L. larvata

Binomial name
- Lagonosticta larvata (Rüppell, 1840)

= Black-faced firefinch =

Species of bird

The black-faced firefinch (Lagonosticta larvata) is a common species of estrildid finch found in Africa. It has an estimated global extent of occurrence of 2,100,000 km^{2}.

It is found in Benin, Burkina Faso, Cameroon, Central African Republic, Chad, The Democratic Republic of the Congo, Côte d'Ivoire, Ethiopia, Gambia, Ghana, Guinea-Bissau, Mali, Niger, Nigeria, Senegal, Sierra Leone, Sudan, Togo and Uganda. The status of the species is evaluated as Least Concern.

Lagonosticta vinacea was a separate species, but findings by Dowsett and Forbes-Watson in 1993 led to reassigning of the L. vinacea species as a population under L. larvata.
