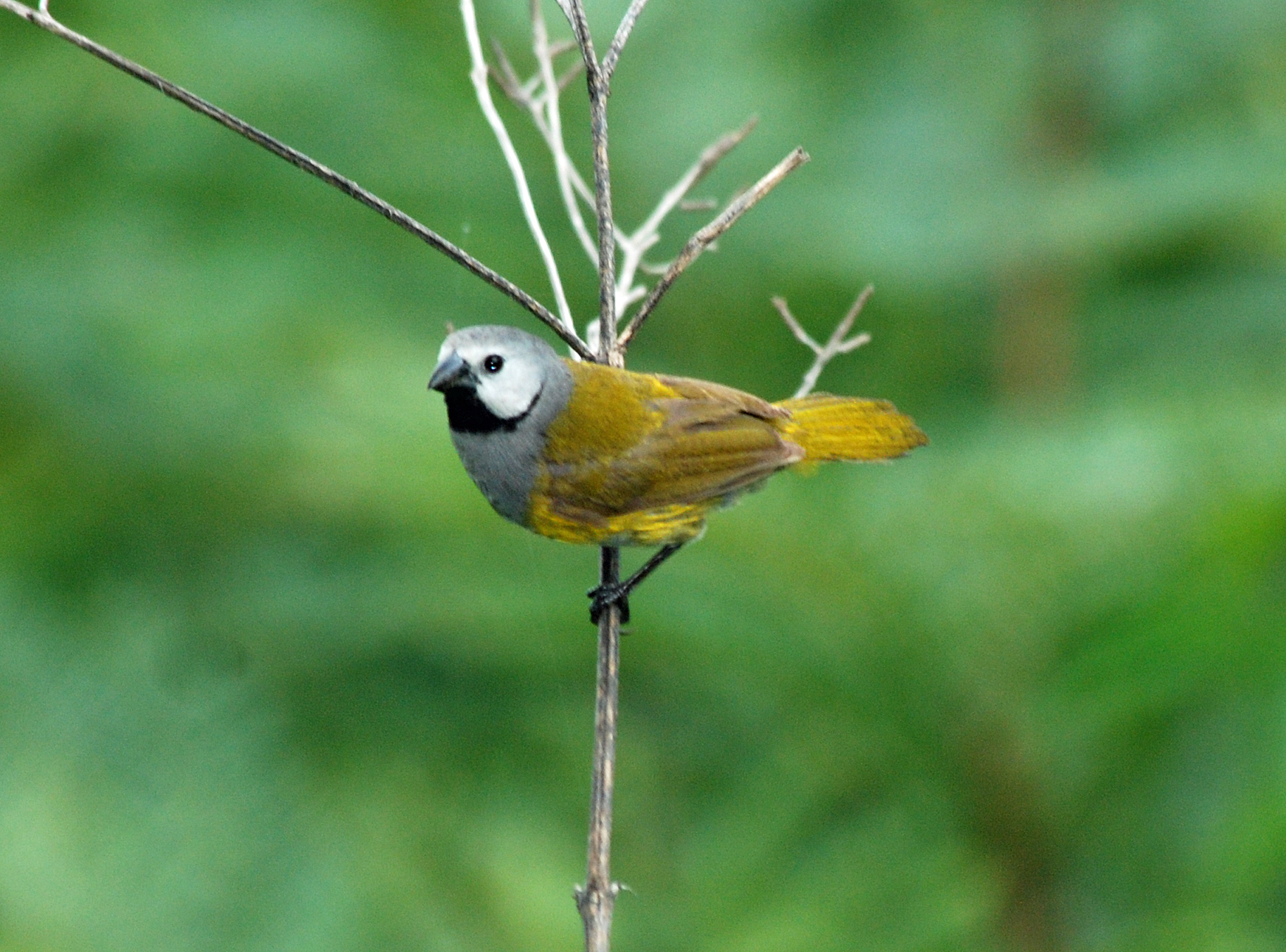

Conservation status
- Least Concern (IUCN 3.1)

Scientific classification
- Kingdom: Animalia
- Phylum: Chordata
- Class: Aves
- Order: Passeriformes
- Family: Estrildidae
- Genus: Delacourella; Wolters, 1949
- Species: D. capistrata

Binomial name
- Delacourella capistrata (Hartlaub, 1861)

Synonyms
- Nesocharis capistrata

= Grey-headed oliveback =

Species of bird

The grey-headed oliveback (Delacourella capistrata), also known as the white-cheeked oliveback, is a common species of estrildid finch. It has an estimated global extent of occurrence of 800,000 km^{2} (310,000 sq mi).

It is native to the Sudan (region) and adjacent areas. The status of the species is evaluated as Least Concern.
