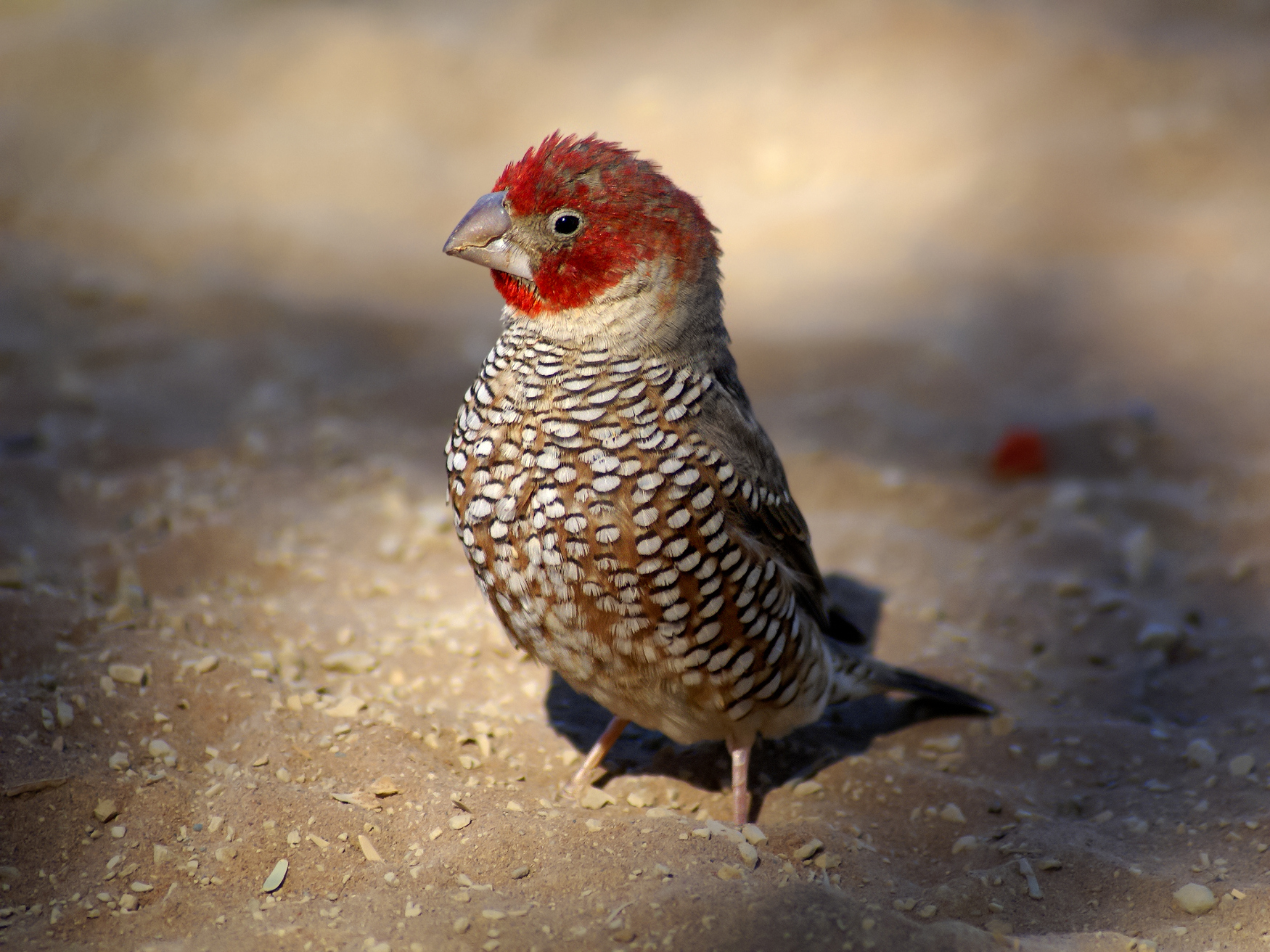
- male

Conservation status
- Least Concern (IUCN 3.1)

Scientific classification
- Kingdom: Animalia
- Phylum: Chordata
- Class: Aves
- Order: Passeriformes
- Family: Estrildidae
- Genus: Amadina
- Species: A. erythrocephala

Binomial name
- Amadina erythrocephala (Linnaeus, 1758)

= Red-headed finch =

Species of bird

The red-headed finch (Amadina erythrocephala) (also known as the paradise finch) is a common species of estrildid finch found in Africa. It has an estimated global extent of occurrence of 1,600,000 km^{2} (620,000 sq mi). It is found in Angola, Botswana, Lesotho, Namibia, South Africa and Zimbabwe.

Males have vibrant red heads and chests while the females are duller. The resemblance to the cut-throat finch is unmistakable. The red-headed and cut-throat finch are the only members of the genus Amadina. Amadinas with their heavy beaks resemble members of the Lonchura, so they are actually more closely related to the Pytilias such as the Melba finch.

== Taxonomy ==
The red-headed finch was formally described by the Swedish naturalist Carl Linnaeus in 1758 in the tenth edition of his Systema Naturae under the binomial name Loxia eryocephala, a misspelling of Loxia erythrocephala. The specific epithet combines the Ancient Greek eruthros meaning "red" with -kephalos meaning "headed". Linnaeus based his description on "The Sparrow of Paradise" that had been described and illustrated in 1751 by the English naturalist George Edwards in his A Natural History of Uncommon Birds. Edwards' specimen had been collected in Angola. This species is now placed with the cut-throat finch in the genus Amadina that was introduced in 1827 by the English naturalist William Swainson. The species is monotypic: no subspecies are recognised.

== Behaviour ==
Often seen in small flocks on dry savannahs, the red-headed finch is a ground feeder which feeds companionably with other species and often visits waterholes. It has a distinctive double-noted chuck-chuck call.
