= Lake Sonfon =

Lake in Sierra Leone

- Lake Confon
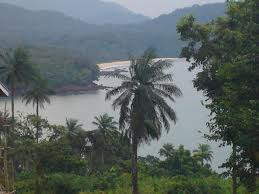

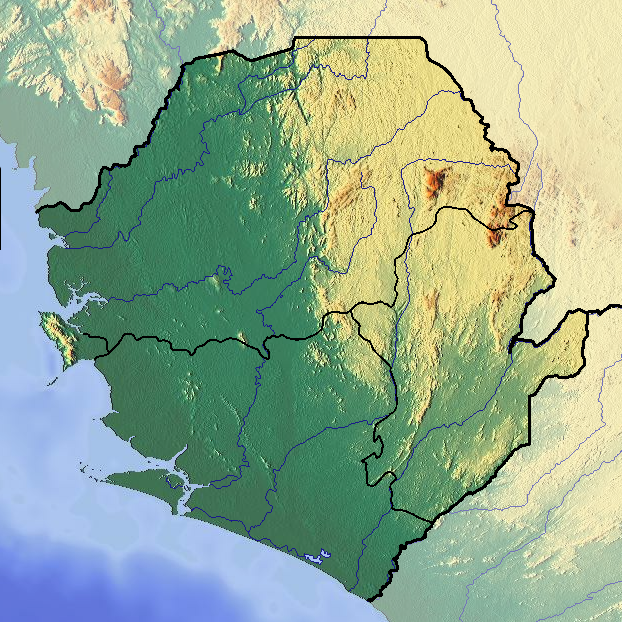
- Location within Sierra Leone
- Location: Diang; Koinadugu District
- Coordinates: 09°15′N 11°30′W
- Primary inflows: 7 small streams
- Primary outflows: Pampana River
- Basin countries: Sierra Leone
- Surface area: 8.2 km^{2} (3.2 sq mi)
- Max. depth: 8 m (26 ft)
- Surface elevation: 549 m (1,801 ft)

Lake Sonfon, also known as Lake Confon, is a fresh water mountain lake in Diang, Sierra Leone that is of religious and cultural significance.

== Geography ==
The nearest towns are Kabala that is 60 km to the north and Benugu that is 40 km to the south. It is located in the hills of the Sula Mountains at an altitude of 549 m (1,801 ft) above sea level. Sonfon drains from its southern end, which forms the start of the Pampana River, and is fed by seven small streams with its water level varying considerably during the year. The Lake has a maximum depth of 8 m (26 ft) and with an area of 8.2 km^{2} (3.2 sq mi) is Sierra Leone's largest inland lake.

=== Environment ===
The Lake is a key conservation area and a proposed protected area but as of 2011 there is no protection in place. In the dry season the lake is completely covered with vegetation. The hill environment around the lake consist of forests, wooded savanna, grassland and farmbush. An 8,000 ha area encompassing the lake, as well as its vegetated environs, has been designated an Important Bird Area (IBA) by BirdLife International because it supports significant populations of many bird species. Although the lake is not well surveyed, 105 species of birds have been identified, including the iris glossy-starling, Dybowski's twinspot, splendid sunbird, red-faced pytilia and pied-winged swallow. Mammals that live at the lake include the endangered pygmy hippopotamus, and black and Maxwell's duikers.

== History ==
Lake Sonfon is considered sacred in traditional belief with local people carrying out cultural ceremonies along its shore. Offerings, including rice and food, are floated into the lake on calabashes. In traditional belief the lake is symbolically intermittent, as well as being intermittent in terms of the amount of water in the dry season, with a powerful Djinn living in the lake.

Gold deposits are found in the rocks of Lake Sonfon and in alluvial deposits in the area. Only the alluvial deposits are being worked, employing 15,000 miners around the Lake. This mining is causing the level of water in the lake to decrease.

== See also ==
- Protected areas of Sierra Leone
- Wildlife of Sierra Leone
