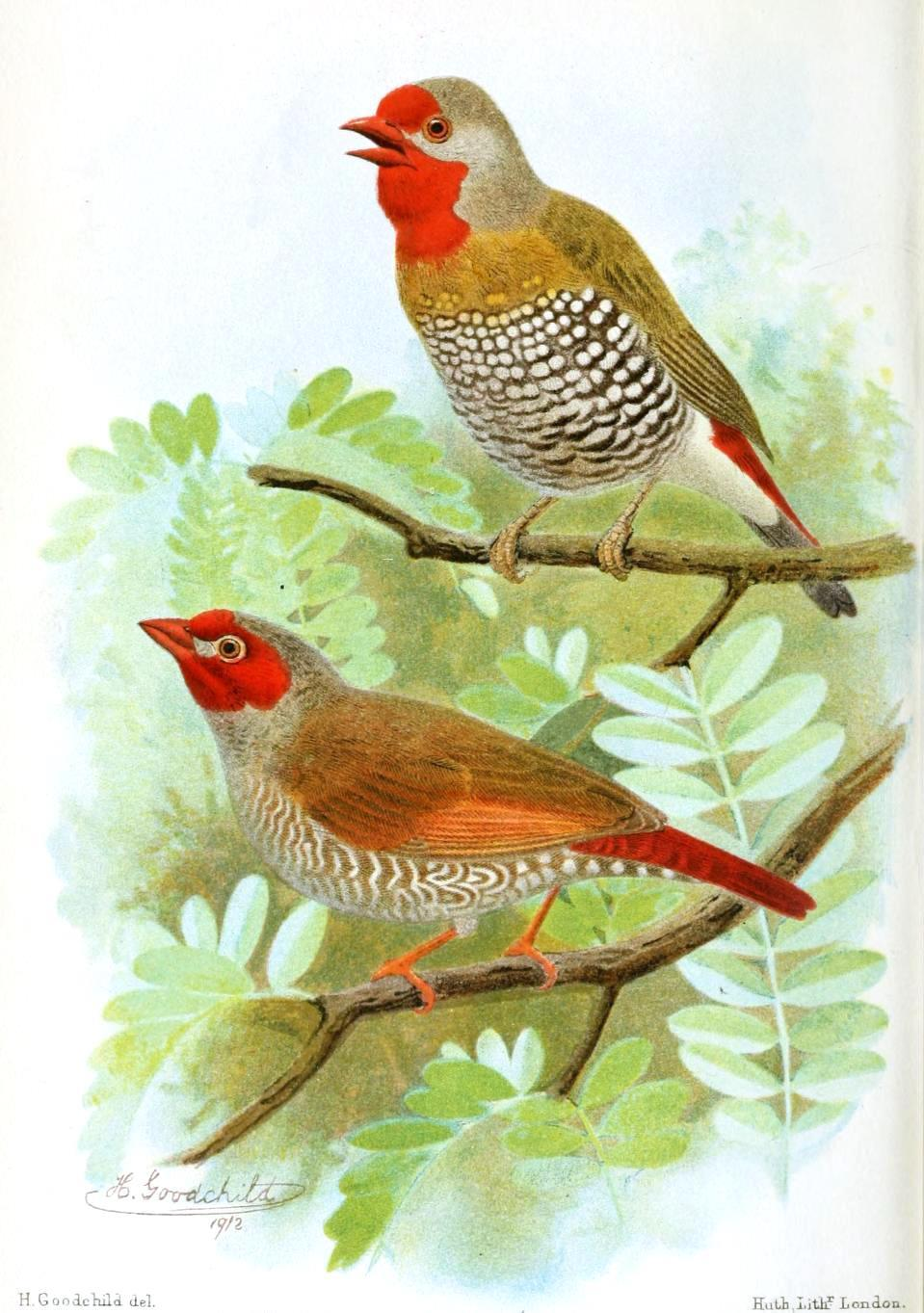
- Green- and Orange-winged pytilias

Scientific classification
- Kingdom: Animalia
- Phylum: Chordata
- Class: Aves
- Order: Passeriformes
- Family: Estrildidae
- Genus: Pytilia; Swainson, 1837

Type species
- Pytilia phoenicoptera red-winged pytilia Swainson, 1837

= Pytilia =

Genus of birds

Pytilia is a genus of small brightly coloured seed-eating birds in the family Estrildidae. They are distributed across Africa.

== Taxonomy ==
The genus Pytilia was introduced in 1837 by the English naturalist William Swainson for the red-winged pytilia. The name Pytilia is a diminutive of the genus Pitylus that had been introduced in 1829 by the French naturalist Georges Cuvier for the grosbeaks. A molecular phylogenetic study has shown that the genus is basal to a clade containing the twinspots in the genera Euschistospiza, Hypargos and Clytospiza and the firefinches in Lagonosticta.

=== Species ===
The genus contains the following five species:

Image	Common name	Scientific name	Distribution
	Orange-winged pytilia	Pytilia afra	Angola, Botswana, Burundi, the Republic of Congo, the Democratic Republic of the Congo, Ethiopia, Kenya, Malawi, Mozambique, Rwanda, South Africa, South Sudan, Tanzania, Uganda, Zambia and Zimbabwe
	Red-winged pytilia	Pytilia phoenicoptera	Benin, Burkina Faso, Cameroon, Central African Republic, Chad, The Democratic Republic of the Congo, Côte d'Ivoire, Ethiopia, Gambia, Ghana, Guinea, Guinea-Bissau, Mali, Niger, Nigeria, Senegal, Sierra Leone, Sudan, Togo and Uganda
	Red-billed pytilia	Pytilia lineata	Ethiopia
	Green-winged pytilia	Pytilia melba	Sub-Saharan Africa
	Yellow-winged pytilia	Pytilia hypogrammica	Benin, Burkina Faso, Cameroon, Central African Republic, Chad, The Democratic Republic of the Congo, Côte d'Ivoire, Ghana, Guinea, Liberia, Nigeria, Sierra Leone and Togo
