= Geography of Sierra Leone =

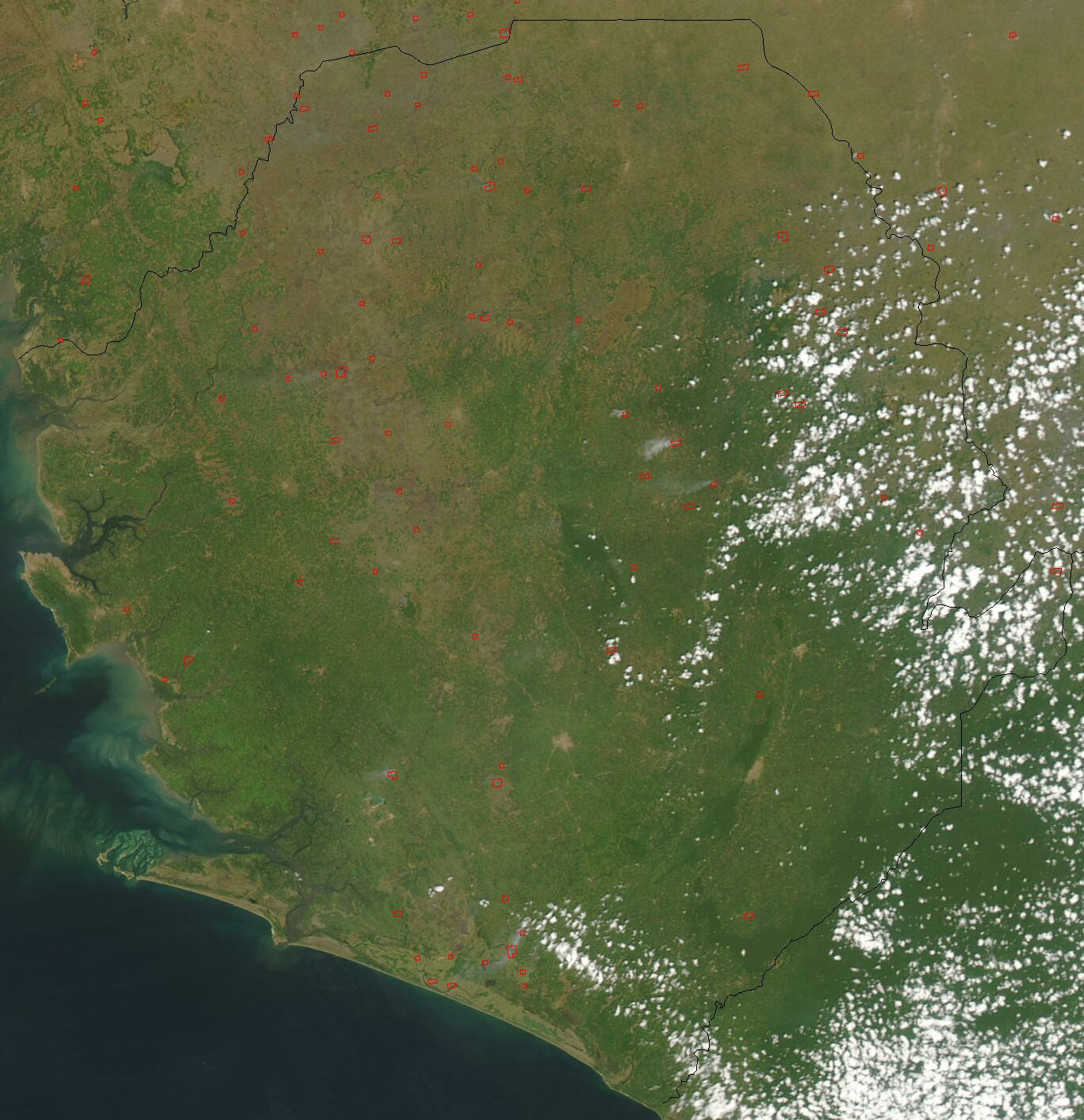
- Continent: Africa
- Region: Western Africa
- Coordinates: 08°30′00″N 12°06′00″W
- Area
  - Total: 73,252 km^{2} (28,283 sq mi)
  - Land: 99.8%
  - Water: 0.2%
- Coastline: 402 km (250 mi)
- Highest point: Mount Bintumani 1,948 meters (6,391 ft)
- Lowest point: Atlantic Ocean 0m
- Longest river: Rokel River 400 km (250 mi)
- Largest lake: Lake Sonfon 8.2 km^{2} (3.2 mi^{2})
- Climate: tropical
- Terrain: coastal belt of mangrove swamps, wooded hill country, an upland plateau, mountains in the east
- Natural resources: mineral deposits (diamonds, titanium ore, bauxite, iron ore, gold, chromite)
- Natural hazards: dry, sand-laden Harmattan winds blow from the Sahara (December to February); sandstorms, dust storms
- Environmental issues: rapid population growth; deforestation from increased cattle grazing and agriculture, land degradation and flooding; biodiversity loss; air and water pollution; overfishing

Sierra Leone is a country in West Africa with a North Atlantic Ocean coastline to the west. It lies on the African Plate. The country's main geographical features include wooded hill country, an upland plateau, and mountains in the east. The highest peak is Mount Bintumani, which is 1,948 meters (6,391 ft) above sea level. The coastline has a belt of mangrove swamps. Freetown, the nation's capital city, has one of the world's largest natural harbours. The Rokel River is the largest river in Sierra Leone. It is 400 kilometres (250 mi) long and has a basin with a total area of 10,622 square kilometres (4,101 sq mi).

Sierra Leone is located at approximately 8.5°N 12.1°W, between the 7th and 10th parallels north of the equator. It is bordered by Guinea to the north and northeast, and Liberia to the south and southeast. The country has a total area of 73,252 km^{2} (28,283 sq mi), divided into a land area of 73,132 km^{2} (28,236 sq mi) and water of 120 km^{2} (46 sq mi).

== Physical geography ==
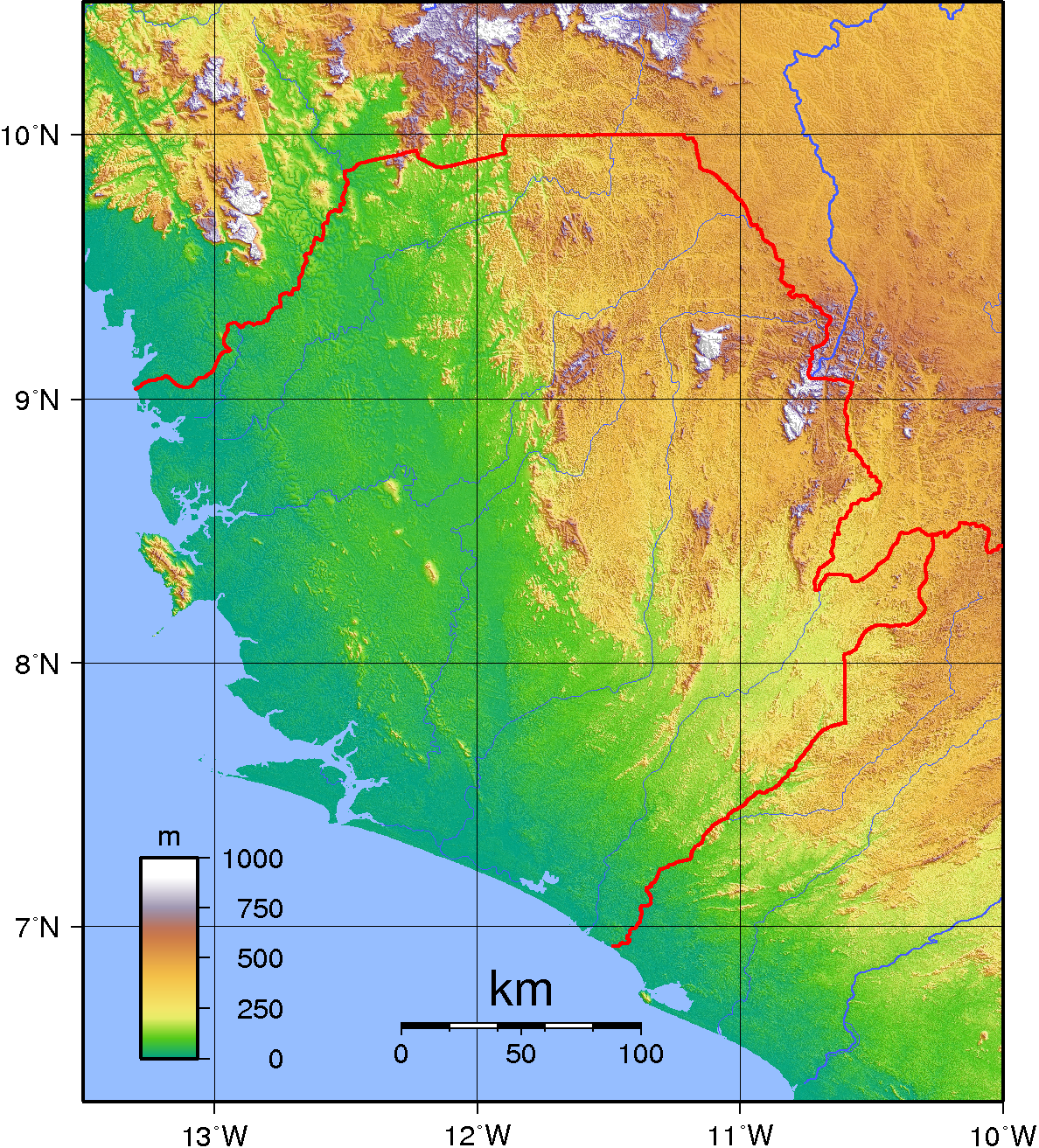
Sierra Leone's topography

Sierra Leone is located on the west coast of Africa, between the 7th and 10th parallels north of the equator. Sierra Leone is bordered by Guinea to the north and northeast, Liberia to the south and southeast, and the Atlantic Ocean to the west. The country has a total area of 73,253 km^{2} (28,283 sq mi), divided into a land area of 73,132 km^{2} (28,236 sq mi) and water of 120 km^{2} (46 sq mi).

Sierra Leone has four distinct geographical regions: coastal Guinean mangroves, the wooded hill country, an upland plateau, and the eastern mountains. Eastern Sierra Leone is an interior region of large plateaus interspersed with high mountains, where Mount Bintumani rises to 1,948 meters (6,391 ft).

=== Geology ===
Sierra Leone can be split into three geological areas, in the east is part of the West African craton, the western area consists of the Rokelides, an orogenic belt, and a 20- to 30-km coastal strip of sediments.

=== Extreme points ===
This is a list of the extreme points of Sierra Leone, the points that are farther north, south, east or west than any other location.

- Northernmost point – the northern section of the border with Guinea, Northern Province*
- Easternmost point – the tripoint with Guinea and Liberia, Eastern Province
- Southernmost point – unnamed peninsula south of the town of Mano Salija at the mouth of the Mano River, Southern Province
- Westernmost point – the point at which the border with Guinea enters the Atlantic Ocean, North West Province
- *Note: Sierra Leone does not have a northernmost point, the border being formed here by 10th parallel north

== Climate ==
Sierra Leone map of Köppen climate classification areas

The climate is tropical; although it could be classified as a tropical monsoon climate, it could also be described as a climate that is transitional between a continually wet tropical rainforest climate and a tropical savanna climate.

There are two seasons; dry season (November – May) and rainy season (June – October).

December to January are the coolest months of the year, although temperatures can still exceed 40 °C or 104 °F, lower to moderate humidity makes the heat around this time of the year more tolerable. Unlike March and April, the months that it gets hot and humid with temperatures around 33 to 36 °C or 91 to 97 °F and a solid 50% humidity, making the heat index higher than the actual temperature. The average sea temperature is 30 °C or 86 °F.

Average rainfall is highest at the coast, 3,000 to 5,000 millimetres or 120 to 200 inches per year; moving inland this decreases and at the eastern border of the country, the average rainfall is 2,000 to 2,500 millimetres or 80 to 100 inches.

Climate data for Freetown, Sierra Leone (1961-1990, extremes 1947-1990)
Month	Jan	Feb	Mar	Apr	May	Jun	Jul	Aug	Sep	Oct	Nov	Dec	Year
Record high °C (°F)	36.0 (96.8)	38.0 (100.4)	38.0 (100.4)	38.5 (101.3)	35.0 (95.0)	35.0 (95.0)	33.0 (91.4)	32.0 (89.6)	31.0 (87.8)	35.0 (95.0)	36.5 (97.7)	33.5 (92.3)	38.5 (101.3)
Mean daily maximum °C (°F)	29.9 (85.8)	30.3 (86.5)	30.9 (87.6)	31.2 (88.2)	30.9 (87.6)	30.1 (86.2)	28.7 (83.7)	28.4 (83.1)	29.0 (84.2)	29.9 (85.8)	30.1 (86.2)	29.7 (85.5)	29.9 (85.9)
Daily mean °C (°F)	27.3 (81.1)	27.6 (81.7)	28.1 (82.6)	28.5 (83.3)	28.3 (82.9)	27.4 (81.3)	26.3 (79.3)	25.9 (78.6)	26.4 (79.5)	27.1 (80.8)	27.7 (81.9)	27.5 (81.5)	27.3 (81.2)
Mean daily minimum °C (°F)	23.8 (74.8)	24.0 (75.2)	24.4 (75.9)	24.8 (76.6)	24.4 (75.9)	23.6 (74.5)	23.1 (73.6)	23.0 (73.4)	23.1 (73.6)	23.4 (74.1)	24.0 (75.2)	24.1 (75.4)	23.8 (74.9)
Record low °C (°F)	15.0 (59.0)	17.8 (64.0)	19.4 (66.9)	20.0 (68.0)	20.6 (69.1)	20.0 (68.0)	19.4 (66.9)	19.4 (66.9)	20.0 (68.0)	19.4 (66.9)	20.0 (68.0)	15.6 (60.1)	15.0 (59.0)
Average rainfall mm (inches)	8.0 (0.31)	6.0 (0.24)	28.0 (1.10)	68.0 (2.68)	214.0 (8.43)	522.0 (20.55)	1,190 (46.85)	1,078 (42.44)	800.0 (31.50)	333.0 (13.11)	148.0 (5.83)	38.0 (1.50)	4,433 (174.54)
Average rainy days	0	0	1	4	15	22	27	27	24	21	9	2	152
Average relative humidity (%)	66	67	67	68	73	76	81	82	80	78	76	69	74
Mean monthly sunshine hours	226.3	215.6	232.5	207.0	189.1	153.0	102.3	86.8	126.0	186.0	198.0	161.2	2,083.8
Source 1: NOAA, Deutscher Wetterdienst (extremes),
Source 2: Worldwide Bioclimatic Classification System

== Environment issues ==
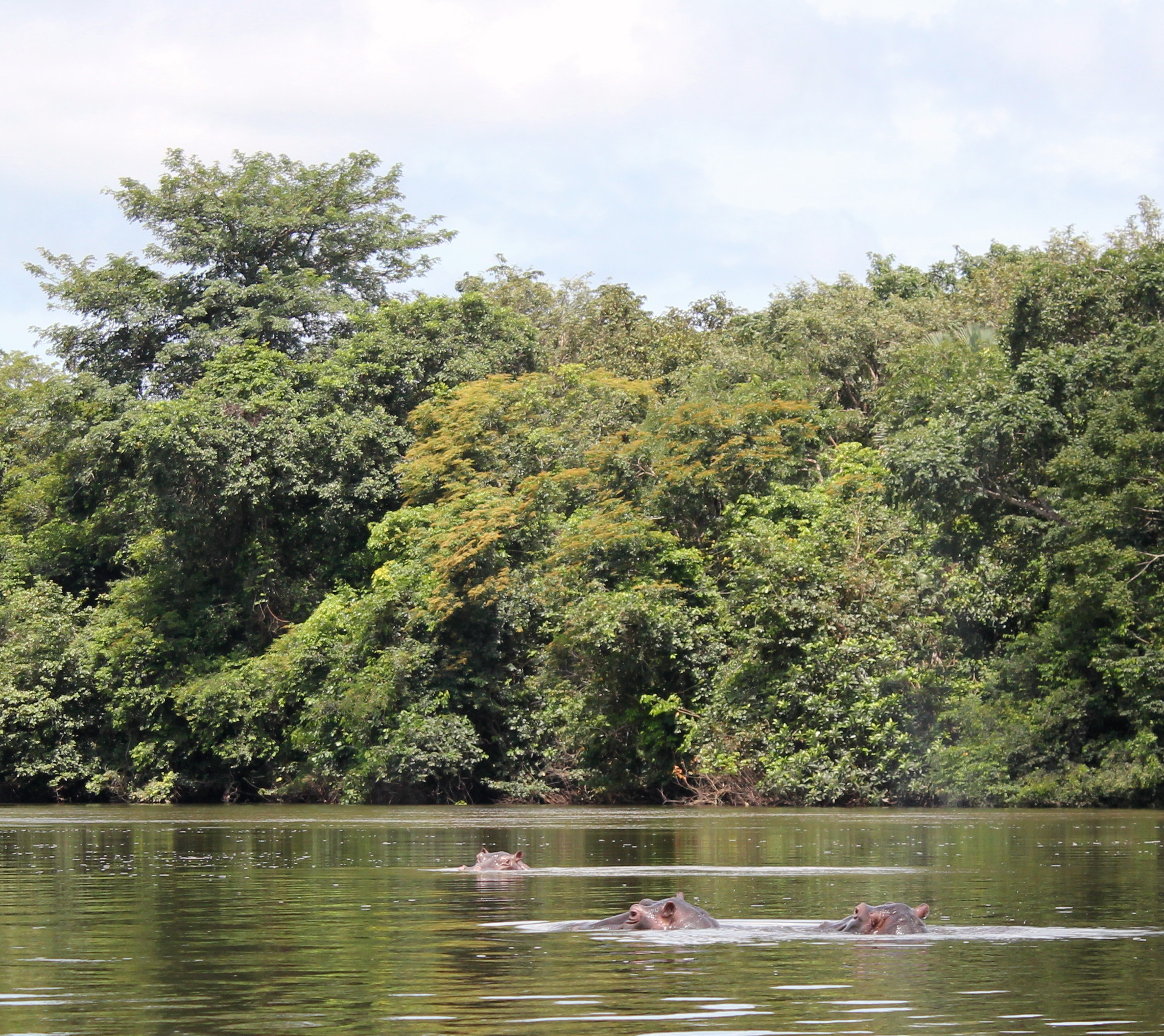
Hippopotami in the Outamba-Kilimi National Park in Sierra Leone's northwest.

Rapid population growth in Sierra Leone has put pressure upon the natural environment. Environmental problems include the overharvesting of timber, the expansion of cattle grazing and slash and burn agriculture have resulted in deforestation and soil exhaustion, and overfishing.

Sierra Leone is party to several environmental agreements:

- Biodiversity (Convention on Biological Diversity)
- Climate Change (United Nations Framework Convention on Climate Change)
- Desertification (United Nations Convention to Combat Desertification)
- Endangered Species (CITES)
- Law of the Sea (UNCLOS or LOS)
- Marine Life Conservation (Convention on Fishing and Conservation of Living Resources of the High Seas)
- Nuclear Test Ban (CTBT)
- Ramsar Convention(Wetlands)

Signed, but not ratified:

- Environmental Modification (ENMOD)

== General information ==
Location of Sierra Leone

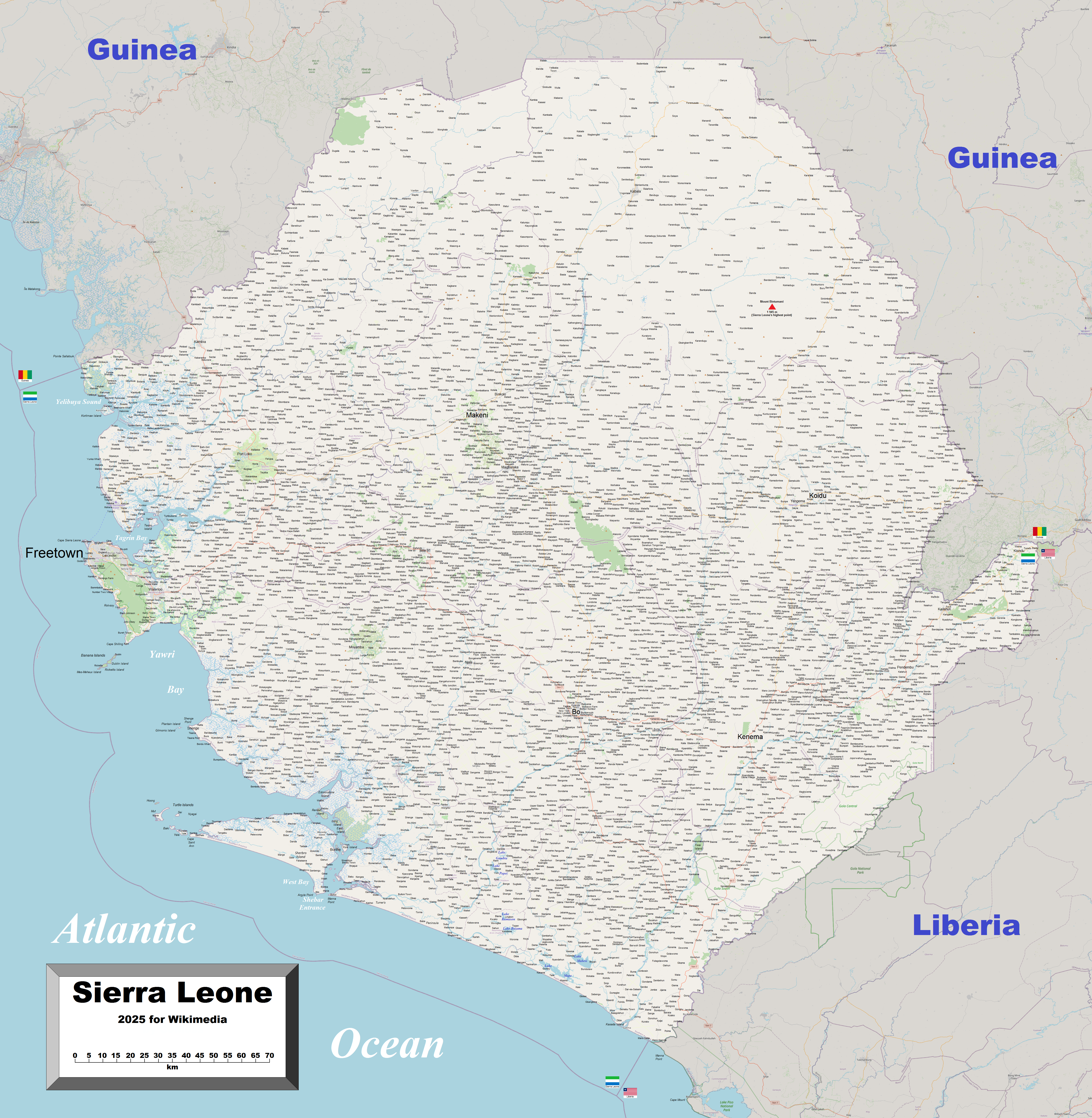
Detailed map of Sierra Leone

Geographic coordinates: 8°30′N 11°30′W

Area
- Total: 73,252 km²
  - country rank in the world: 117th
- Land: 73,132 km²
- Water: 120 km²

Area comparative
- Australia comparative: slightly larger than Tasmania
- Canada comparative: approximately the size of New Brunswick
- United Kingdom comparative: slightly smaller than Scotland
- United States comparative: approximately 1/7 larger than West Virginia
- EU comparative: slightly smaller than Ireland

Land boundaries
- total: 1,093 km
- border countries: Guinea 794 km, Liberia 299 km

Coastline
402 km

Maritime claims
- territorial sea: 200 nmi (370.4 km; 230.2 mi).
- contiguous zone: 24 nmi (44.4 km; 27.6 mi).
- exclusive economic zone: 200 nmi (370.4 km; 230.2 mi).
- continental shelf: 200 m depth or to the depth of exploitation.

Climate
tropical monsoon; hot, humid; summer rainy season (May to December); winter dry season (December to April)

Terrain
coastal belt of mangrove swamps, wooded hill country, upland plateau, mountains in east

Elevation extremes
- lowest point: Atlantic Ocean 0 m
- highest point: Loma Mansa (Bintimani) 1,948 m

Natural resources
diamonds, titanium ore, bauxite, iron ore, gold, chromite

Land use
- arable land: 24.4%
- permanent crops: 2.3%
- permanent pasture: 30.5%
- forest: 37.5%
- other: 6.3% (2011)

Irrigated land
300 km^{2}; (2012)

Total renewable water resources
160 km^{3}; (2011)

Natural hazards
dry, sand-laden harmattan winds blow from the Sahara (December to February); sandstorms, dust storms

== See also ==
- Protected areas of Sierra Leone
- Administrative divisions of Sierra Leone

== Sources ==
- Blinker, Linda (2006). "Country Environment Profile (CEP) Sierra Leone" (PDF). Freetown: Consortium Parsons Brinckerhoff. Archived from the original (PDF) on 1 October 2008.
- Gabler, Robert E.; Petersen, James F.; Trapasso, L. Michael; Sack, Dorothy (2008). Physical Geography. Cengage Learning. ISBN 978-0-495-55506-3.
- Hughes, R. H; Hughes, J. S. (1992). A Directory of African Wetlands. IUCN. ISBN 978-2-88032-949-5.
- LeVert, Suzanne (2007). Cultures of the World: Sierra Leone. Marshall Cavendish. ISBN 978-0-7614-2334-8.
- Schlüter, Thomas; Trauth, Martin H. (2008). Geological Atlas of Africa: with notes on stratigraphy, tectonics, economic geology, geohazards, geosites and geoscientific education of each country. Springer. ISBN 978-3-540-76324-6.
