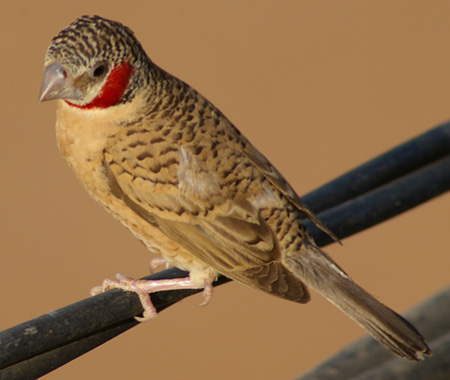
- Cut-throat finch (Amadina fasciata)

Scientific classification
- Kingdom: Animalia
- Phylum: Chordata
- Class: Aves
- Order: Passeriformes
- Family: Estrildidae
- Genus: Amadina; Swainson, 1827

Type species
- Loxia fasciata (Cut-throat finch) Gmelin, JF, 1789

Species
- Cut-throat finch Red-headed finch

= Amadina =

Genus of birds

Amadina is a genus of estrildid finches that are found in Africa.

== Taxonomy ==
The genus Amadina was introduced in 1827 by the English naturalist William Swainson with the cut-throat finch as the type species. The name Amadina is a corrupted diminutive of the genus name Ammodramus, the genus of several American sparrows. Swainson thought the cut-throat finch formed a link between that genus and the genus Estrilda, and created the name to reflect that linkage.

=== Species ===
The genus contains the following two species:

Genus Amadina – Swainson, 1827 – two species
| Common name | Scientific name and subspecies | Range | Size and ecology | IUCN status and estimated population |
|---|---|---|---|---|
| Cut-throat finch Male Female | Amadina fasciata (Gmelin, JF, 1789) Four subspecies: A. f. fasciata (Gmelin, JF, 1789); A. f. alexanderi Neumann, 1908; A. f. meridionalis Neunzig, 1910; A. f. contigua Clancey, 1970 | Sub-Saharan Africa | Size: Habitat: Diet: | LC |
| Red-headed finch Male Female | Amadina erythrocephala (Linnaeus, 1758) | Angola, Botswana, Lesotho, Namibia, South Africa and Zimbabwe. | Size: Habitat: Diet: | LC |
