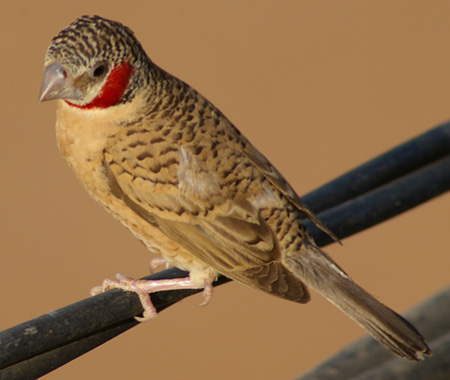
- Male
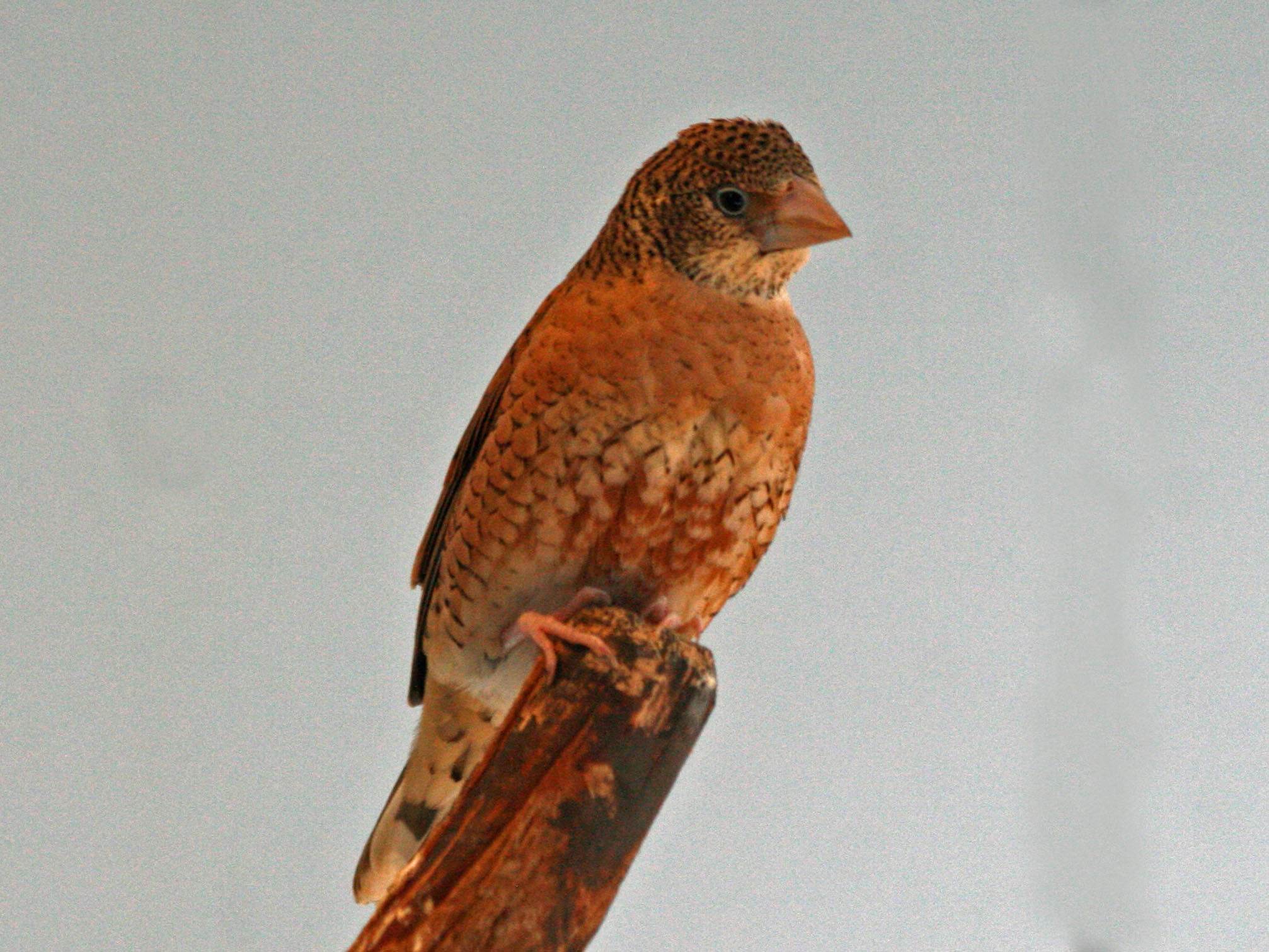
- Female

Conservation status
- Least Concern (IUCN 3.1)

Scientific classification
- Kingdom: Animalia
- Phylum: Chordata
- Class: Aves
- Order: Passeriformes
- Family: Estrildidae
- Genus: Amadina
- Species: A. fasciata

Binomial name
- Amadina fasciata (Gmelin, JF, 1789)

= Cut-throat finch =

Species of bird

The cut-throat finch (Amadina fasciata) is a common species of estrildid finch found throughout Africa; it is also known as the bearded finch, the ribbon finch, the cut throat, and the weaver finch.

== Taxonomy ==
The cut-throat finch was formally described in 1789 by the German naturalist Johann Friedrich Gmelin in his revised and expanded edition of Carl Linnaeus's Systema Naturae. He placed it with the crossbills in the genus Loxia and coined the binomial name Loxia fasciata. The specific epithet is from Late Latin faciatus meaning "banded". Gmelin based his account on the "fasciated grossbeak" that had been described and illustrated in 1776 by the English naturalist Peter Brown. Neither Brown nor Gmelin specified a locality but in 1805 the French ornithologist Louis Pierre Vieillot designated Senegal. The cut-throat finch is now placed with the red-headed finch in the genus Amadina that was introduced in 1827 by the English naturalist William Swainson.

Four subspecies are recognised:

- A. f. fasciata (Gmelin, JF, 1789) – south Mauritania, Senegal and Gambia to Sudan and Uganda
- A. f. alexanderi Neumann, 1908 – Eritrea, Ethiopia and Somalia to Kenya and Tanzania
- A. f. meridionalis Neunzig, 1910 – south Angola and north Namibia to north Mozambique
- A. f. contigua Clancey, 1970 – south Zimbabwe, south Mozambique and north South Africa

== Description ==
The cut-throat finch has plumage that is pale, sandy brown with flecks of black all over. It has a black-brown tail, a thick white chin and cheeks, and a chestnut brown patch on the belly. The legs are a pink fleshy colour. The adult male has a bright red band across its throat (thus the name "cut throat"), while the male juveniles have a slightly duller red band.

It has an estimated global extent of occurrence of 3,300,000 km^{2}. It is found throughout much of Sub-Saharan Africa, particularly in the Sahel, eastern and southern parts of the continent.

== Breeding ==
Cut-throat finches usually use nests constructed by other birds . A clutch usually consists of 3 to 6 white eggs, which hatch after an incubation period of 12–13 days. The chicks leave the nest after 21–27 days but continue to be fed by their parents for a further three weeks.

== Gallery ==
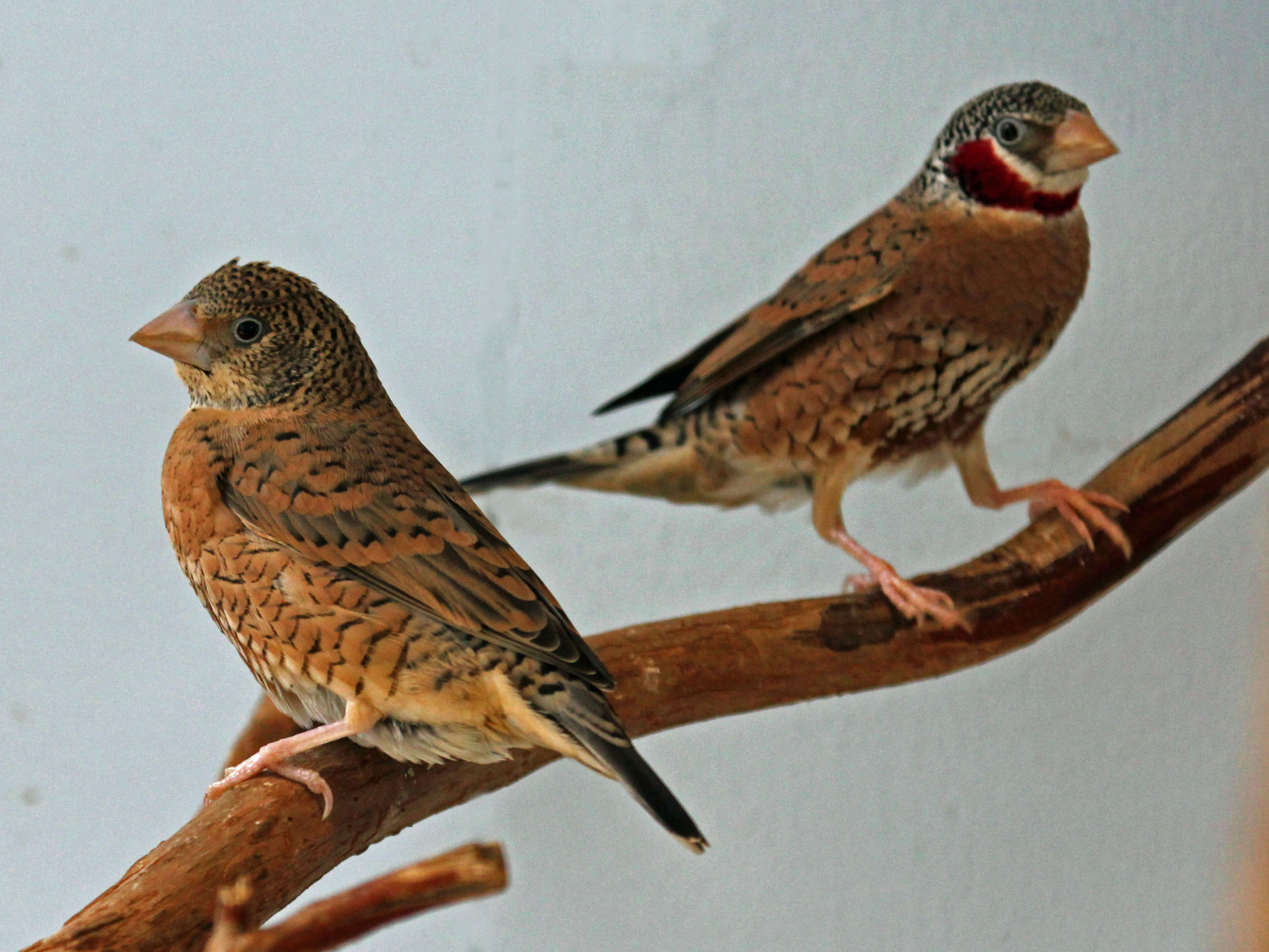
Pair

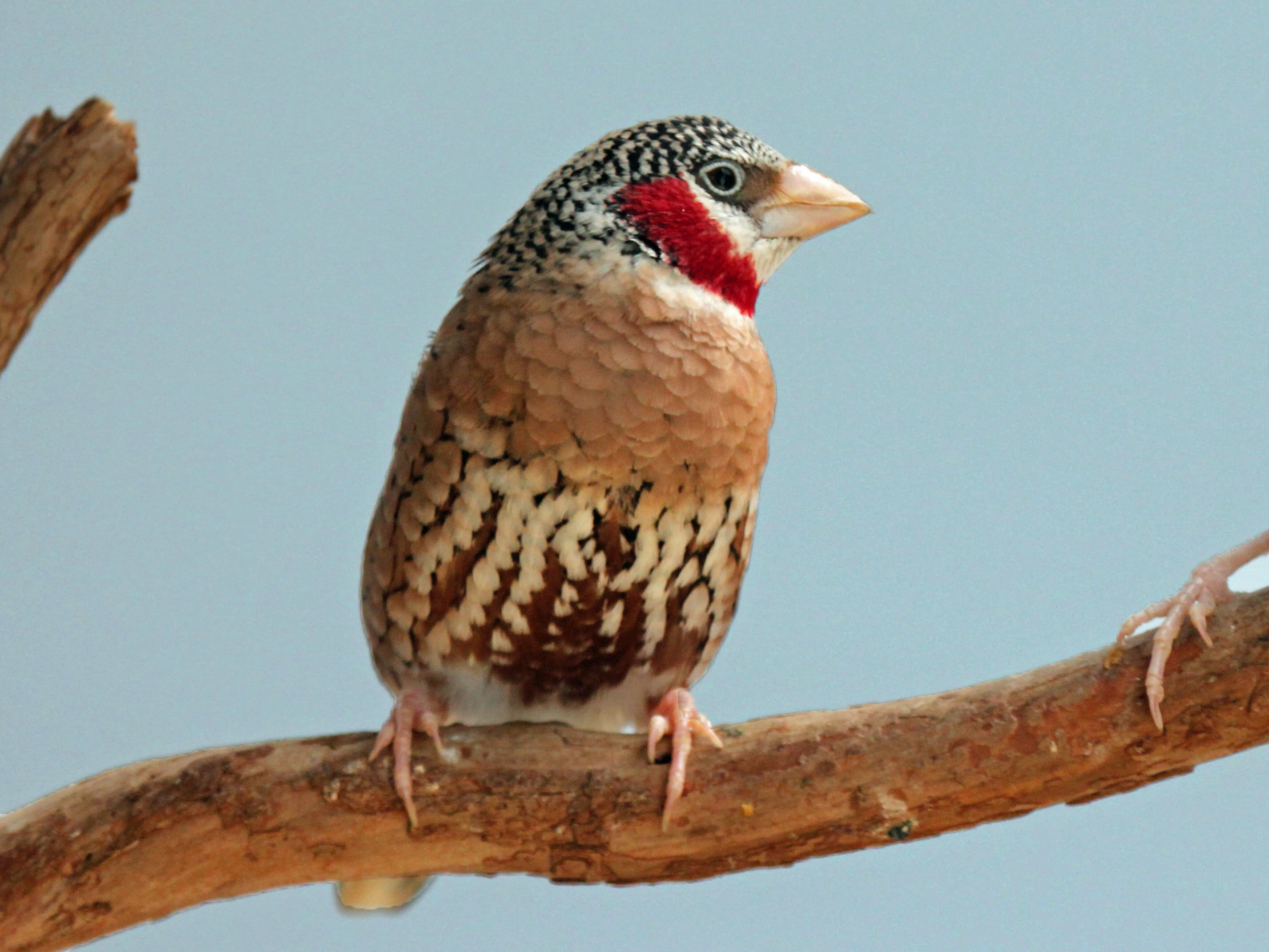
Male
