= Twinspot =

The twinspots are a group of birds placed in four genera of the family Estrildidae:

- Hypargos
- Clytospiza, the brown twinspot, Clytospiza monteiri
- Mandingoa, the green-backed twinspot, Mandingoa nitidula
- Euschistospiza
