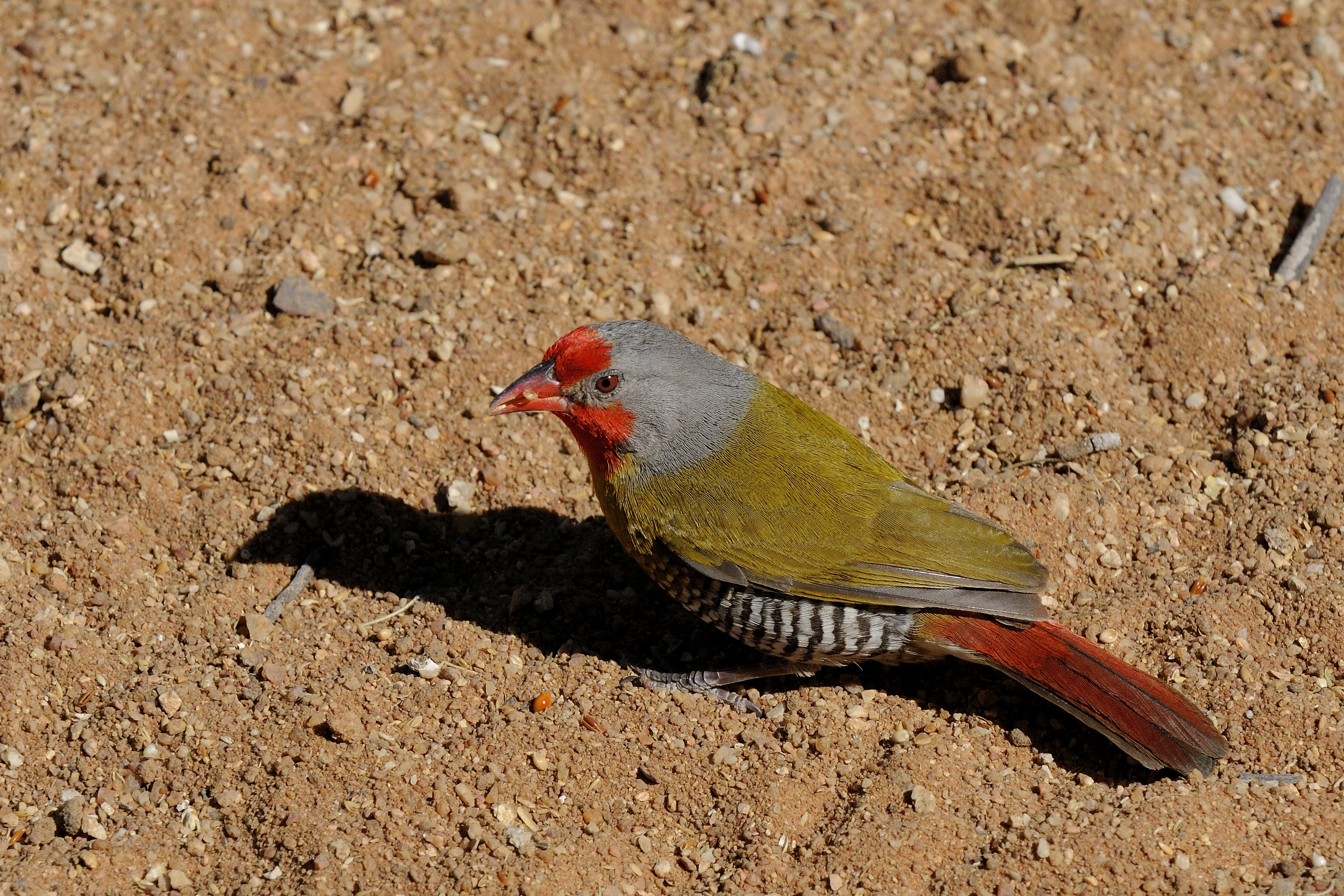
- Adult male P. m. melba, Okonjima, Namibia
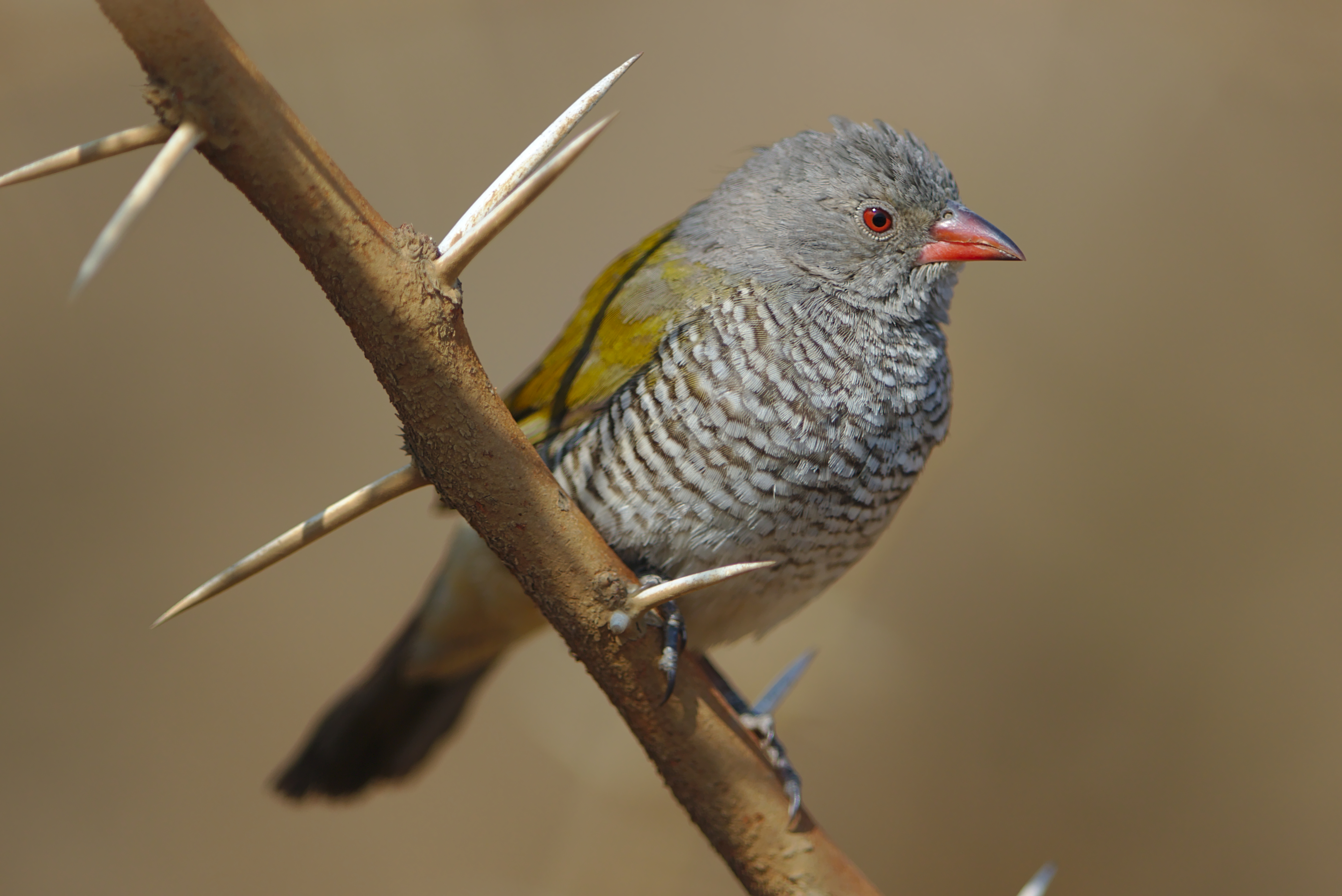
- Female P. m. melba, Pilanesberg National Park

Conservation status
- Least Concern (IUCN 3.1)

Scientific classification
- Kingdom: Animalia
- Phylum: Chordata
- Class: Aves
- Order: Passeriformes
- Family: Estrildidae
- Genus: Pytilia
- Species: P. melba

Binomial name
- Pytilia melba (Linnaeus, 1758)

Synonyms
- Fringilla melba Linnaeus, 1758

= Green-winged pytilia =

Species of bird

The green-winged pytilia (Pytilia melba) is a small colourful seed-eating bird in the family Estrildidae. It is widespread throughout Sub-Saharan Africa, though it is more rarely seen in central, far southern and coastal western parts of the continent.

== Taxonomy ==
The green-winged pytilia was formally described in 1758 by the Swedish naturalist Carl Linnaeus in the tenth edition of his Systema Naturae under the binomial name Fringilla melba. No explanation was provided for the specific epithet melba but it could possibly be from a supposed Chinese word or place. Linnaeus based his description on "The Green Gold-Finch" that had been described and illustrated in 1750 by the English naturalist George Edwards in his A Natural History of Uncommon Birds. Edwards was uncertain of the origin of his specimen and Linnaeus mistakenly specified the locality as China. The specimen was subsequently assumed to be from Angola, but this was restricted to Luanda in Angola by Phillip Clancey in 1962. The green-winged pytilia is now placed in the genus Pytilia that was introduced in 1837 by the English naturalist William Swainson for the red-winged pytilia.

Eight subspecies are recognised:

- P. m. citerior Strickland, 1853 – Mauritania, Senegal and Gambia to south Sudan
- P. m. jessei Shelley, 1903 – northeast Sudan to northwest Somalia
- P. m. soudanensis (Sharpe, 1890) – southeast Sudan, south Ethiopia, central, south Somalia, northeast Uganda and north, east Kenya
- P. m. percivali Van Someren, 1919 – central Kenya to north Tanzania
- P. m. belli Ogilvie-Grant, 1907 – east DR Congo and west Uganda to west Tanzania
- P. m. grotei Reichenow, 1919 – east Tanzania, north Mozambique and east Malawi
- P. m. hygrophila Irwin & Benson, 1967 – north Zambia and north Malawi
- P. m. melba (Linnaeus, 1758) – south Congo and Angola to southwest Tanzania and south to central Namibia, north South Africa and south Mozambique

== Gallery ==
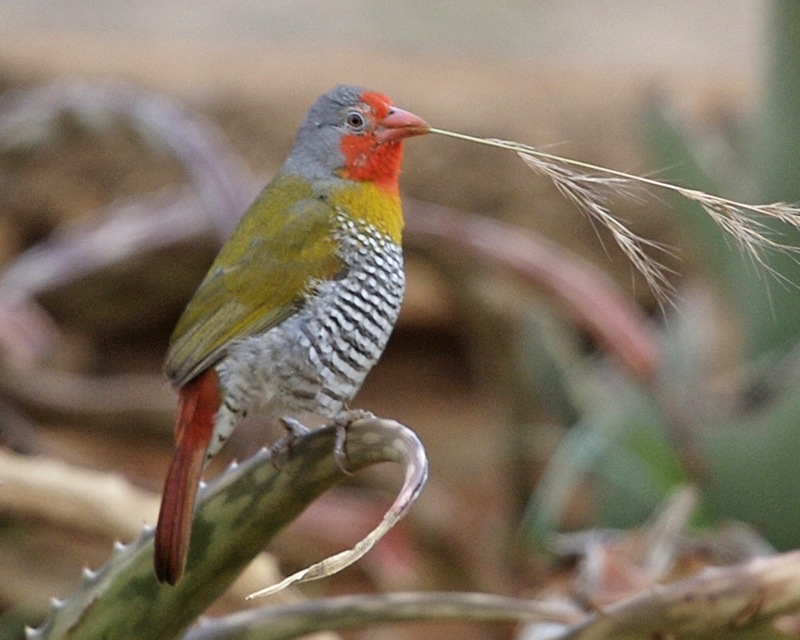
Male P. m. soudanensis, Tsavo East National Park, Kenya

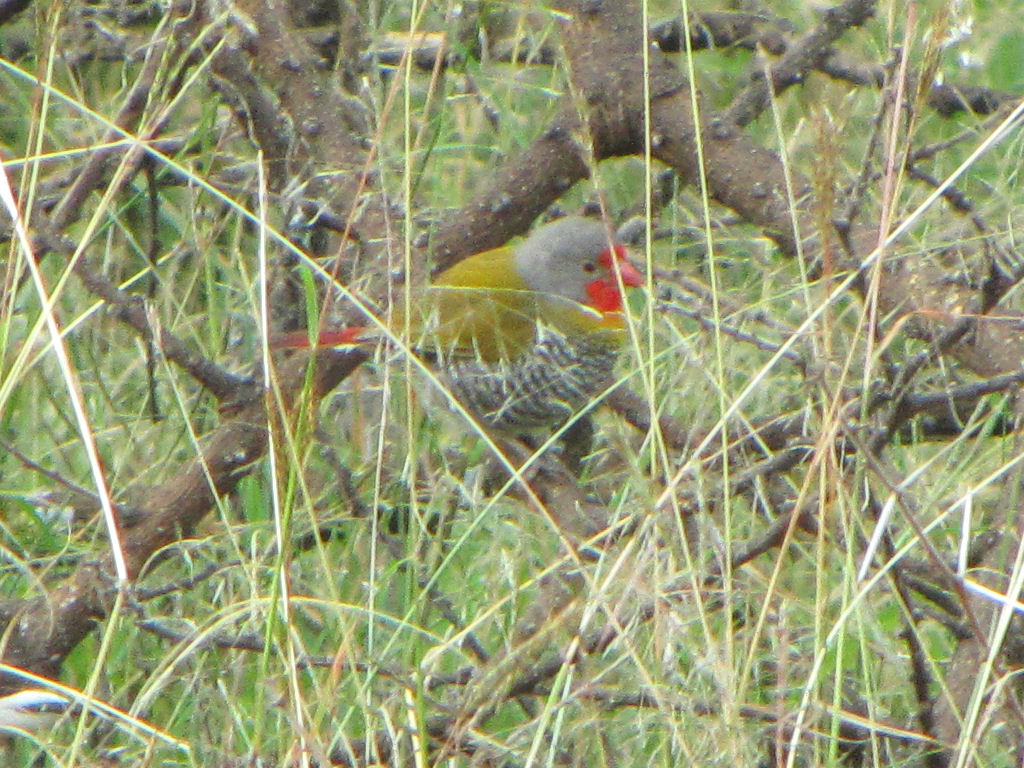
Male P. m. percivali, Serengeti, Tanzania
