= Diang =

Diang may refer to:

- Diang, Cameroon, a town and commune in Cameroon
- Diang, Sierra Leone, a Chiefdom in Sierra Leone
- Diang of Persia, wife of king Yazdegerd II
