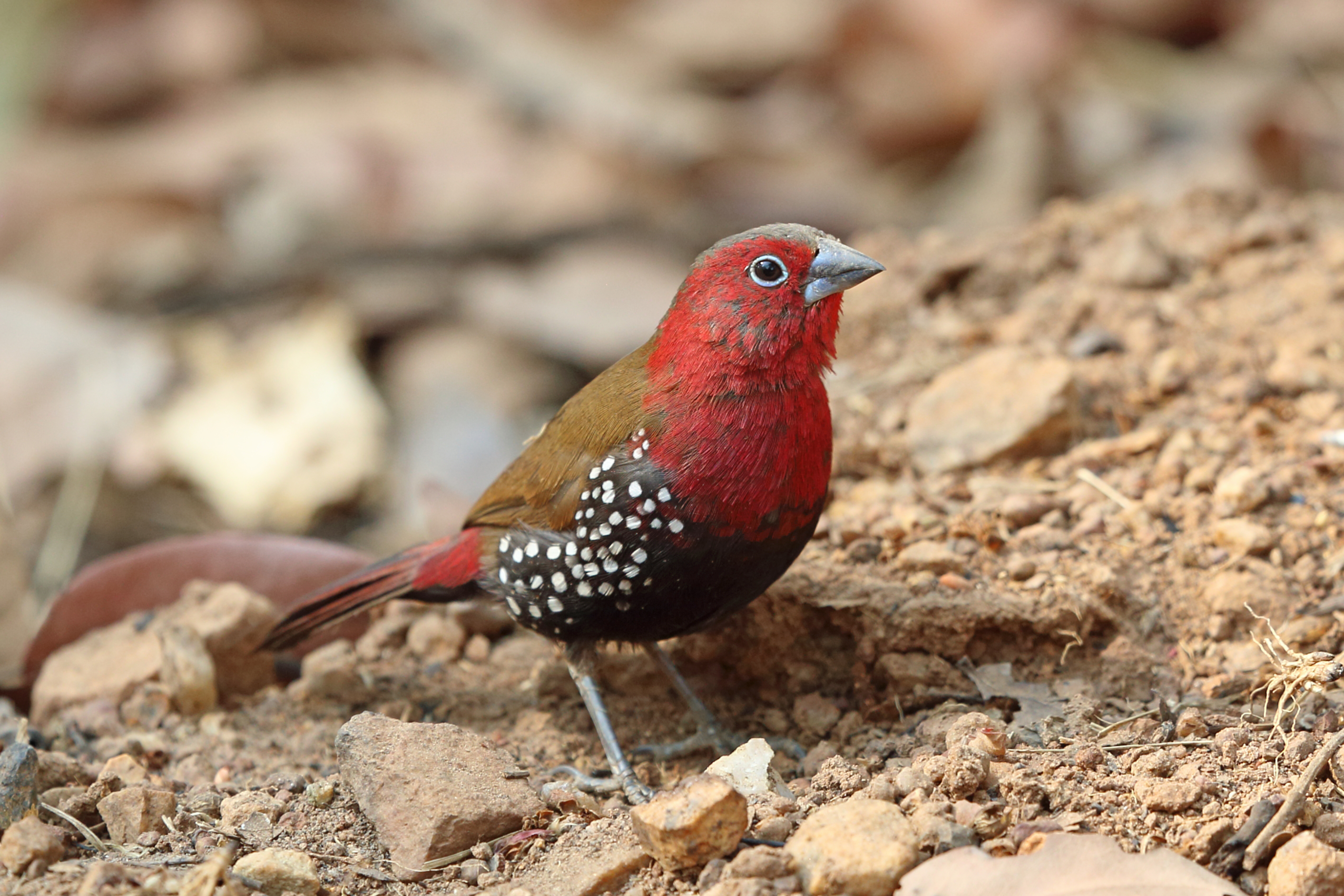

Conservation status
- Least Concern (IUCN 3.1)

Scientific classification
- Kingdom: Animalia
- Phylum: Chordata
- Class: Aves
- Order: Passeriformes
- Family: Estrildidae
- Genus: Hypargos
- Species: H. niveoguttatus

Binomial name
- Hypargos niveoguttatus (Peters, W, 1868)

= Red-throated twinspot =

Species of bird

The red-throated twinspot (Hypargos niveoguttatus) or Peters's twinspot is a common species of bird found in sub-saharan Africa. This species has a large range, with an estimated global extent of occurrence of 2,000,000 km^{2} (770,000 sq mi).

It is commonly seen in Angola, Burundi, The Democratic Republic of the Congo, Kenya, Malawi, Mozambique, Namibia, Rwanda, Somalia, South Africa, Tanzania, Zambia & Zimbabwe. The status of the species is evaluated as Least Concern.
