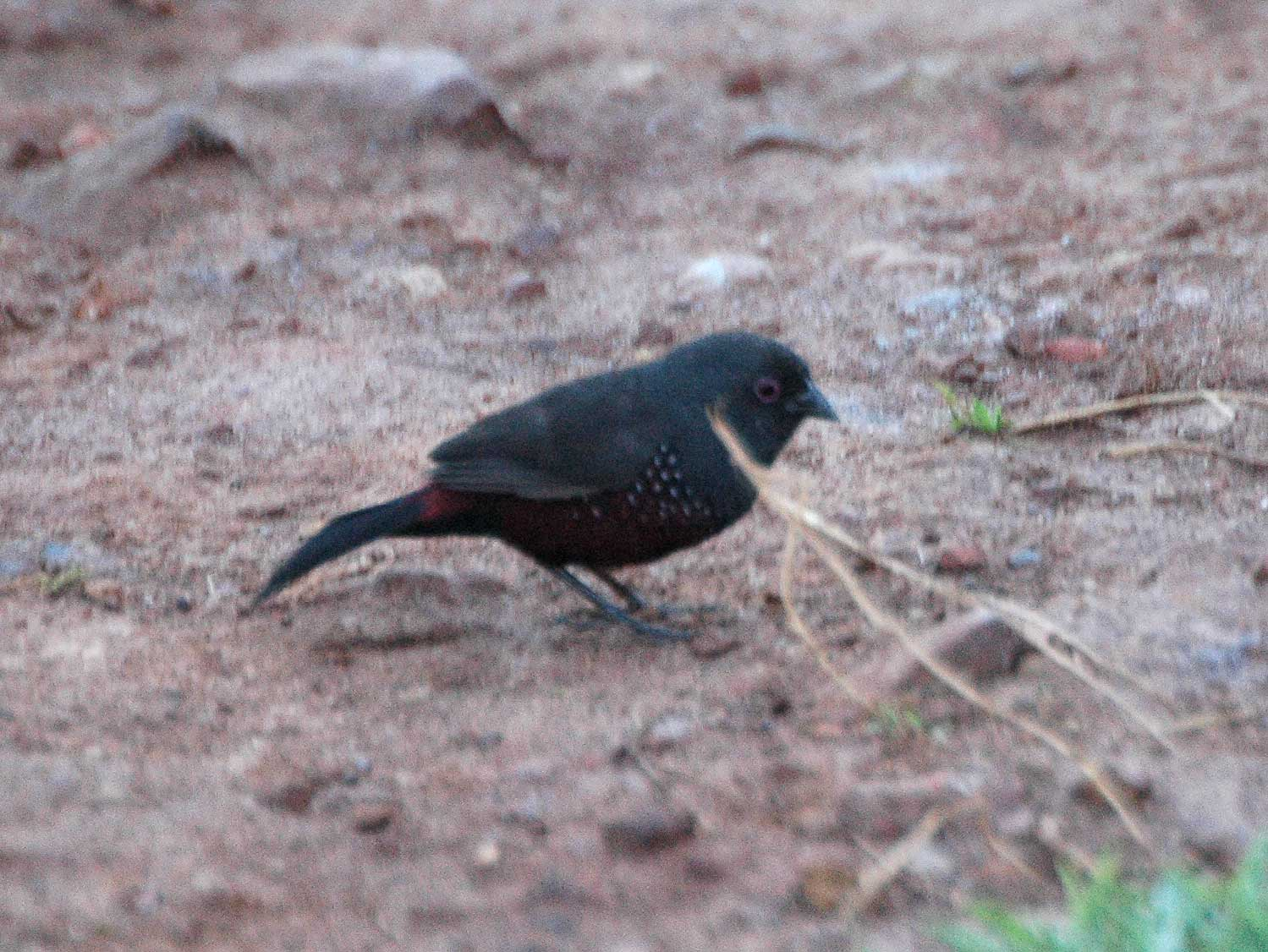

Conservation status
- Least Concern (IUCN 3.1)

Scientific classification
- Kingdom: Animalia
- Phylum: Chordata
- Class: Aves
- Order: Passeriformes
- Family: Estrildidae
- Genus: Euschistospiza
- Species: E. cinereovinacea

Binomial name
- Euschistospiza cinereovinacea (Sousa, 1889)

= Dusky twinspot =

Species of bird

The dusky twinspot (Euschistospiza cinereovinacea) is a species of estrildid finch found in Sub-Saharan Africa. It has an estimated global extent of occurrence of 130,000 km^{2}.

It is native to the Angolan montane forest–grassland mosaic and the Albertine Rift montane forests. The status of the species is evaluated as Least Concern.

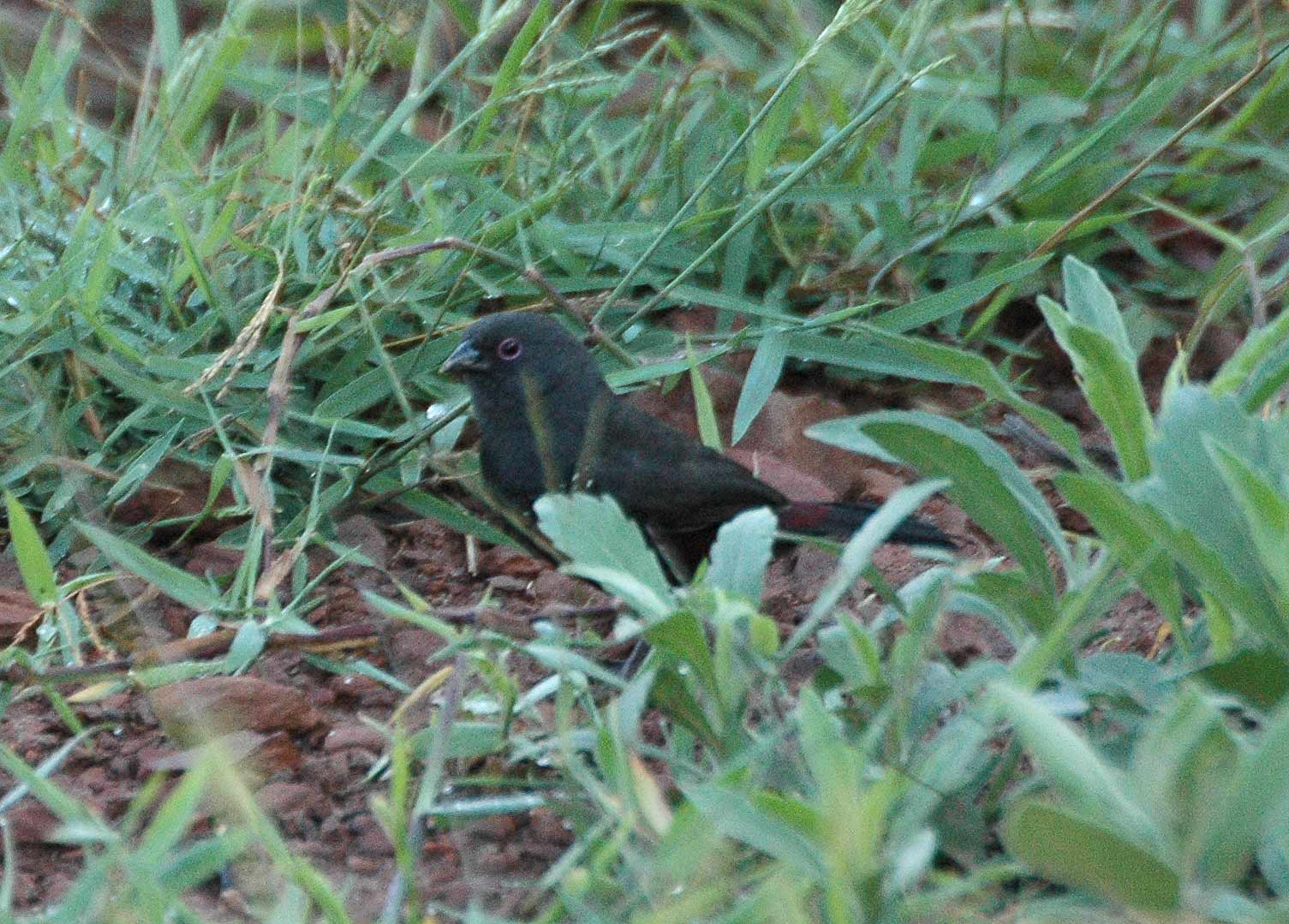
Near Bwindi, SW Uganda
