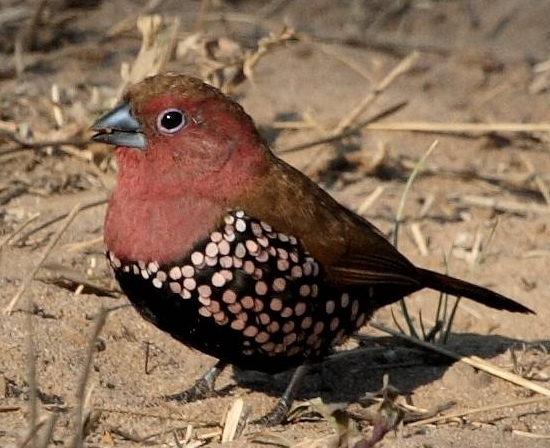
- Male in Mkhuze Game Reserve, South Africa

Conservation status
- Least Concern (IUCN 3.1)

Scientific classification
- Kingdom: Animalia
- Phylum: Chordata
- Class: Aves
- Order: Passeriformes
- Family: Estrildidae
- Genus: Hypargos
- Species: H. margaritatus

Binomial name
- Hypargos margaritatus (Strickland, 1844)

= Pink-throated twinspot =

Species of bird

The pink-throated twinspot (Hypargos margaritatus) is a small seed-eating bird in the family Estrildidae. It inhabits dry savanna and moist, subtropical/tropical (lowland) shrubland habitats near the southeast African coast in Mozambique, South Africa and Eswatini. It has a large range, with an estimated global extent of occurrence of 160,000 km^{2}.
