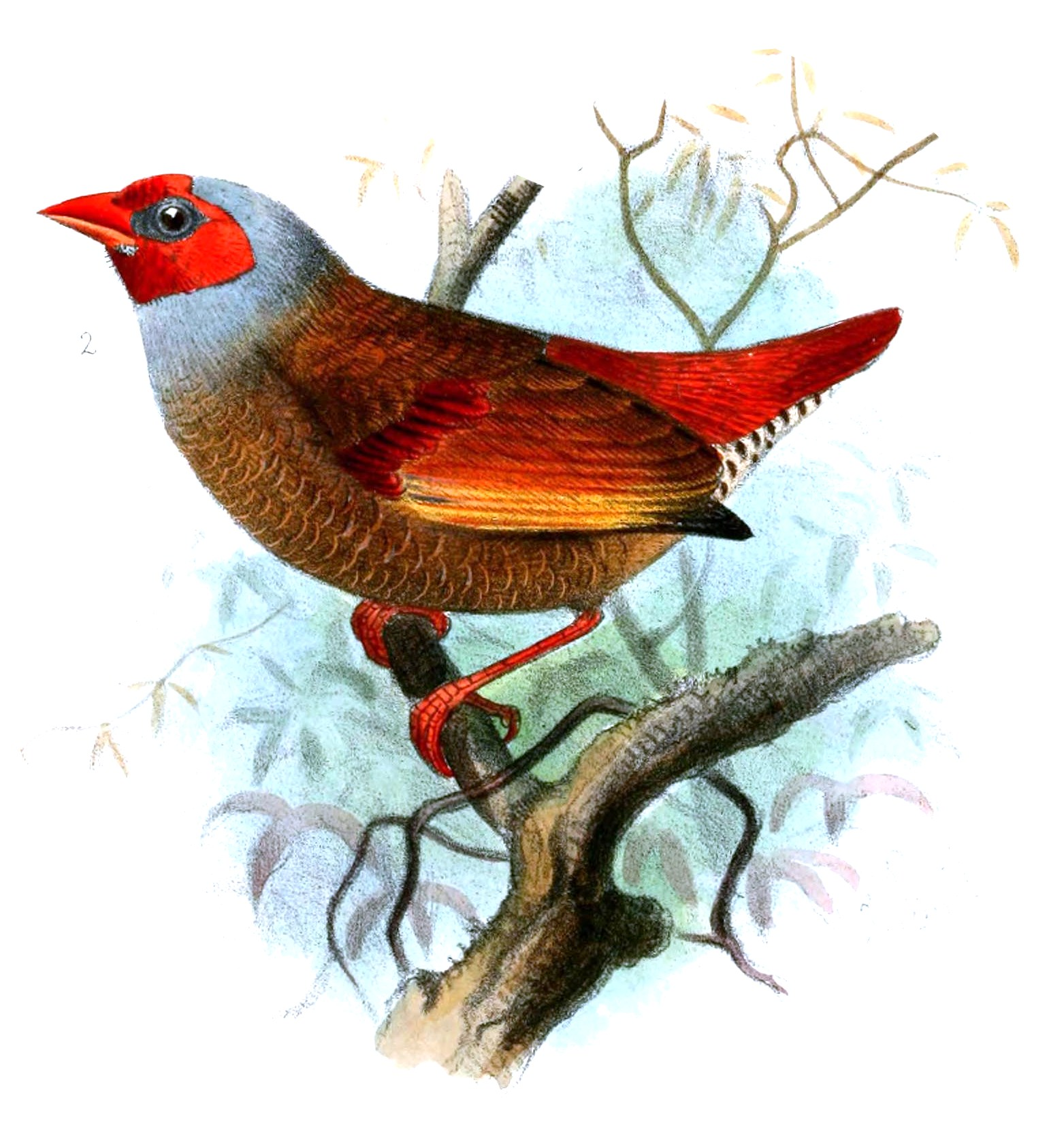
- Male

Conservation status
- Least Concern (IUCN 3.1)

Scientific classification
- Kingdom: Animalia
- Phylum: Chordata
- Class: Aves
- Order: Passeriformes
- Family: Estrildidae
- Genus: Pytilia
- Species: P. afra

Binomial name
- Pytilia afra (Gmelin, JF, 1789)

Synonyms
- Fringilla afra Gmelin, 1789

= Orange-winged pytilia =

Species of bird

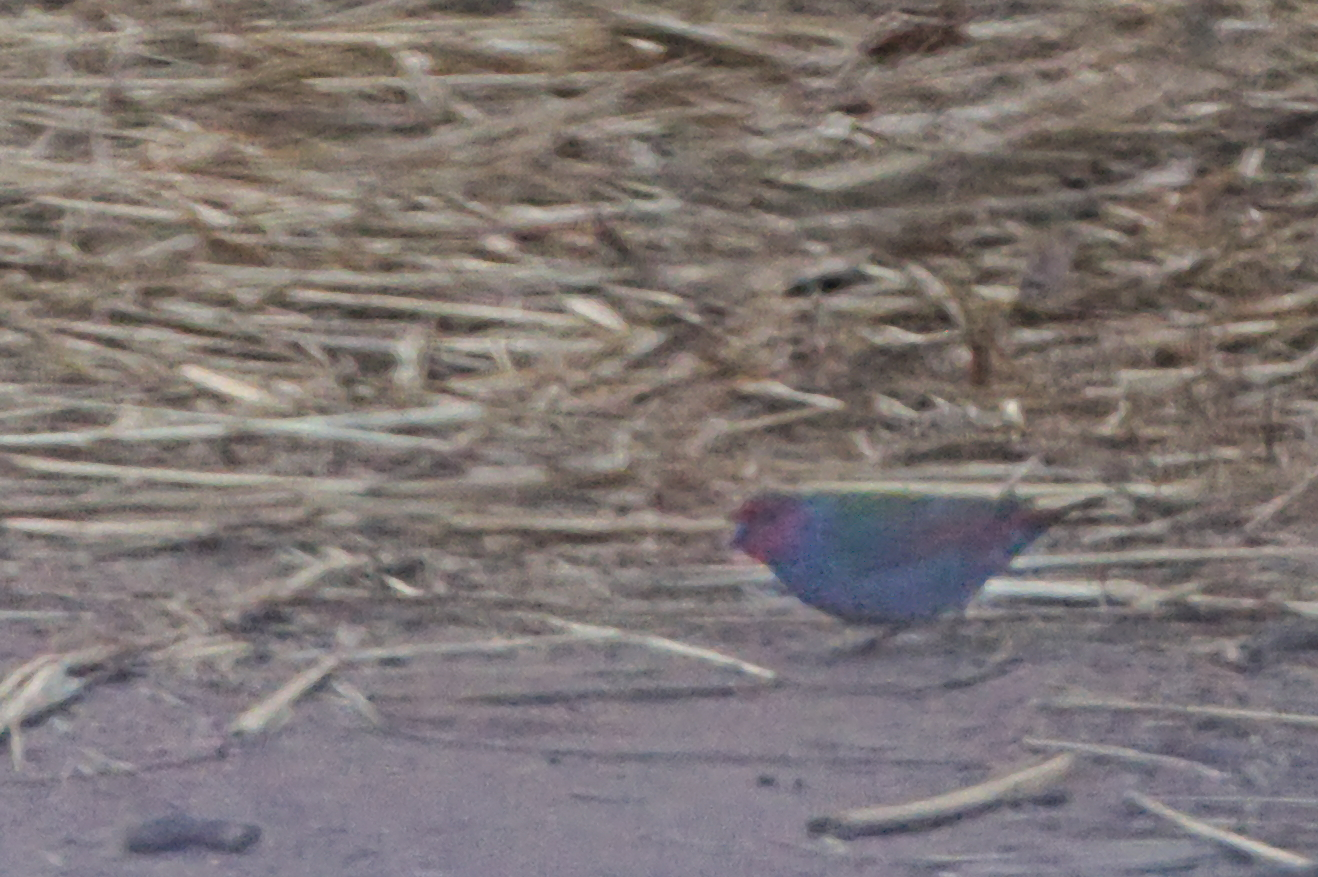
Orange-winged Pytilia

The orange-winged pytilia (Pytilia afra), also known as the golden-backed pytilia, is a species of estrildid finch found in Africa. It has a wide range and the International Union for Conservation of Nature has assessed it as being of least concern.

== Taxonomy ==
The orange-winged pytilia was formally described in 1789 by the German naturalist Johann Friedrich Gmelin in his revised and expanded edition of Carl Linnaeus's Systema Naturae. He placed it with the finches in the genus Fringilla and coined the binomial name Fringilla afra. Gmelin gave the locality as Angola. The specific epithet is from Latin afer meaning "Africa". Gmelin based his account on the "red-faced finch" that had been described and illustrated in 1776 by the English naturalist Peter Brown. The orange-winged pytilia is now one of five pytilias placed in the genus Pytilia that was introduced in 1837 by the English naturalist William Swainson. The species is monotypic: no subspecies are recognised.

== Description ==
The orange-winged pytilia is 11 cm (4.3 in) long and weighs 14–15 g (0.49–0.53 oz). The male's forehead, face and chin are red, and its crown and nape are grey. Its back is green, with an olive tinge. Its greater coverts are orange, and its primary coverts and flight feathers are blackish-brown, with orange edges. Its rump is crimson. The outer webs of its tail are red, and the inner webs are brown. Its throat and upper breast are pale grey, and its breast is olive. There are off-white bars on its breast and belly. Its legs are pale pink or pinkish-brown. Its eyes are orange or red, and its beak is red. The female has a greyish head, with no red. Its back and wings are duller than the male, and the bars on its underparts are broader. The immature bird is like the female, but is drabber.

== Distribution and habitat ==
This pytilia is found in Angola, Botswana, Burundi, the Republic of Congo, the Democratic Republic of the Congo, Ethiopia, Kenya, Malawi, Mozambique, Rwanda, South Africa, South Sudan, Tanzania, Uganda, Zambia and Zimbabwe. It has an estimated global extent of occurrence of 8,160,000 km^{2} (3,150,000 sq mi). Its habitat is edges of forests, miombo woodland and wooded grasslands, usually in moist areas. It is found at elevations up to 1,800 m (5,900 ft) above sea level.

== Behaviour and ecology ==
The orange-winged pytilia is found in small flocks, and can form larger, looser flocks when it is not breeding. It feeds on the ground, eating seeds and probably also insects. In the non-breeding season, it can move great distances to find food. Its call is seee, and its song is quickly repeated whistles. The orange-winged pytilia is parasitised by the broad-tailed paradise whydah, which mimics its call. The orange-winged pytilia's breeding season is April to May in the southeastern Congo Basin, January to May in Zambia and Zimbabwe, March to June in Malawi, and April to June in Tanzania. The eggs weigh approximately 1.42 g (0.050 oz), and those of the brood parasite weigh about 15% more, at 1.64 g (0.058 oz). The pytilia's incubation period is 12 to 13 days, and the nestling period is 21 days.

== Status ==
Because the species has a large range and a stable population trend, the IUCN has classified the species as being of least concern. It may be captured and used as caged birds.
