= Red-billed pytilia =

Conservation status
- Least Concern (IUCN 3.1)

Scientific classification
- Kingdom: Animalia
- Phylum: Chordata
- Class: Aves
- Order: Passeriformes
- Family: Estrildidae
- Genus: Pytilia
- Species: P. lineata

Binomial name
- Pytilia lineata Heuglin, 1863

Species of bird

The red-billed pytilia (Pytilia lineata) is a species of estrildid finch found in Ethiopia. It was split from the red-winged pytilia.
