= Casimir Maistre =

French explorer and geographer

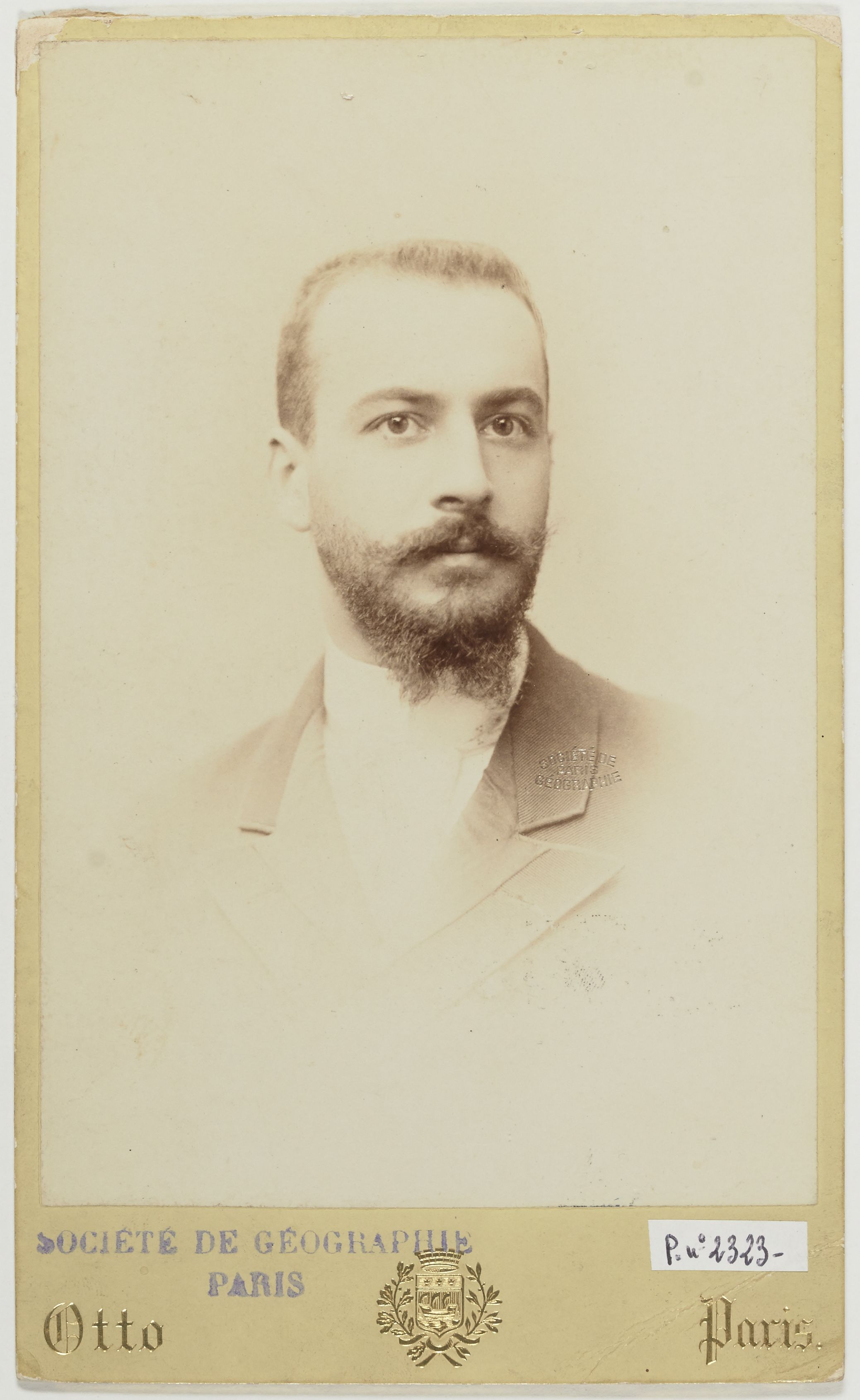
- Casimir Maistre (ca. 1890)
- Born: 24 September 1867; Villeneuvette, Hérault, France
- Died: 20 September 1957 (aged 89); Montpellier, France
- Occupations: Explorer, geographer
- Known for: Exploration of Central Africa; recognition of navigability of the Chari and Logone Rivers
- Notable work: À travers l'Afrique centrale, du Congo au Niger (1893); La région du Bahr Sara (1902)

Casimir Maistre (24 September 1867, Villeneuvette (Hérault) – 20 September 1957, Montpellier) was a French explorer and geographer.

In 1889–91 with Georges Foucart (1865–1943), he participated in the "Catat mission" in Madagascar, an exploratory investigation of the island's resources.

In early 1892 he was sent by the Comité de l'Afrique française to the French Congo in order to reinforce an exploratory mission led by Jean Dybowski (1856–1928). At Brazzaville he met with Dybowski, who was ill and on his way back to France. On 29 June Maistre and a handful of Europeans, departed from their position on the Kémo (a tributary of the Ubanghi) in order to explore largely unfamiliar regions of the continent's interior. On the expedition he would journey over 5000 kilometers, engaging in numerous treaties with African chieftains as a means to consolidate French influence in the region.

In the interior he recognized that the Chari and Logone Rivers were navigable year-round, as well as primary access routes to/from the Lake Chad area. After his return to France, he was honored by the Société de Géographie in 1894 for his exploratory efforts. As a result of the mission, he published two books:

- À travers l'Afrique centrale, du Congo au Niger (1892–1893), (1893)
- La région du Bahr Sara, (1902).

After his return from Africa he settled in Villeneuvette, where he worked as a manager in a family-owned factory.
