= Jean Dybowski =

French agronomist and explorer (1856–1928)

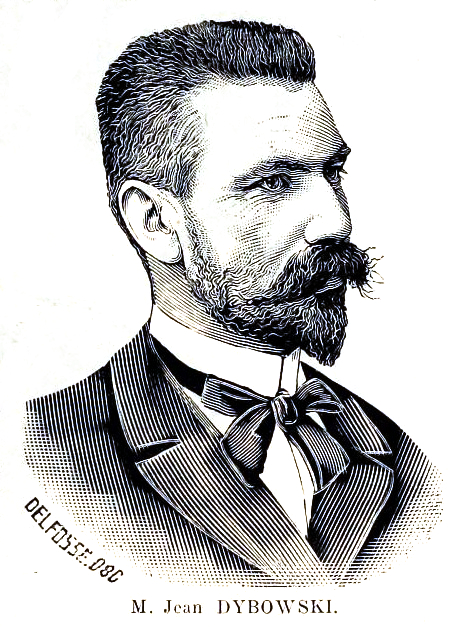
Portrait

Jean Thadée Emmanuel Dybowski (18 April 1856 – 18 December 1928) was a French agronomist, naturalist and explorer of Polish heritage born in Charonne, Paris. He was the cousin of the Polish naturalists Benedykt Dybowski and Władysław Dybowski.

== Biography ==
Born in Charonne, near Paris to Polish parents Józef Dybowski (1812–1885) and Kamila Kosiorowska (1826–1888) who settled in France after the failed November Uprising of 1831. He was a cousin of Benedykt Dybowski.

He studied at the École nationale supérieure d'agronomie in Grignon, where in 1877 he became a lecturer. From 1889 he performed developmental research in southern Algeria.

In March 1891, he left Bordeaux for the French Congo on a mission with designs of expanding and consolidating French influence in the region north of the Ubangi River. In Africa, he was to join forces with explorer Paul Crampel (1864–1891) and to set up outposts in the interior of the continent. When he reached Brazzaville, he was informed that Crampel had been murdered, but nonetheless continued on with the expedition. On 22 November he entered the village of Yabanda, where he reportedly avenged the death of Crampel. Soon afterwards, he reached the village of Makourou, north of the Shari River, but was compelled to turn back south due to shortage of provisions. Dybowski returned to France in April 1892, and despite limited success of the mission from a political standpoint, significant geographical information of the area between the Ubangi and Shari Rivers was gained, as well as important zoological specimens being collected.

For a period of time, he served as a director of agriculture and commerce in Tunisia. He was also an organizer and director of colonial test gardens, and is credited with establishing the agricultural station at Nogent-sur-Marne. During his career, he received numerous distinctions, including being an officer of the Légion d'Honneur.

He was a founder of the French Institute of Colonial Agronomy in Paris, and a member of the Polish Academy of Learning in Kraków.

== Biodiversity legacy ==
In 1892, ornithologist Émile Oustalet (1844–1905) named an African finch species, Dybowski's twinspot (Euschistospiza dybowskii) after him, as did the American zoologist Mary Jane Rathbun with the African freshwater crab (Potamonautes dybowskii).

The Pousargues's mongoose (Dologale dybowskii) is also named after him, as he collected the type-specimens of the species in 1892 during his mission along the Ubangi River.

== Written works ==
- La Route Du Tchad Du Loango Au Chari (1893)
- Guide du jardinage (1899).
- Le Congo méconnu (1912).

== See also ==
- Casimir Maistre
