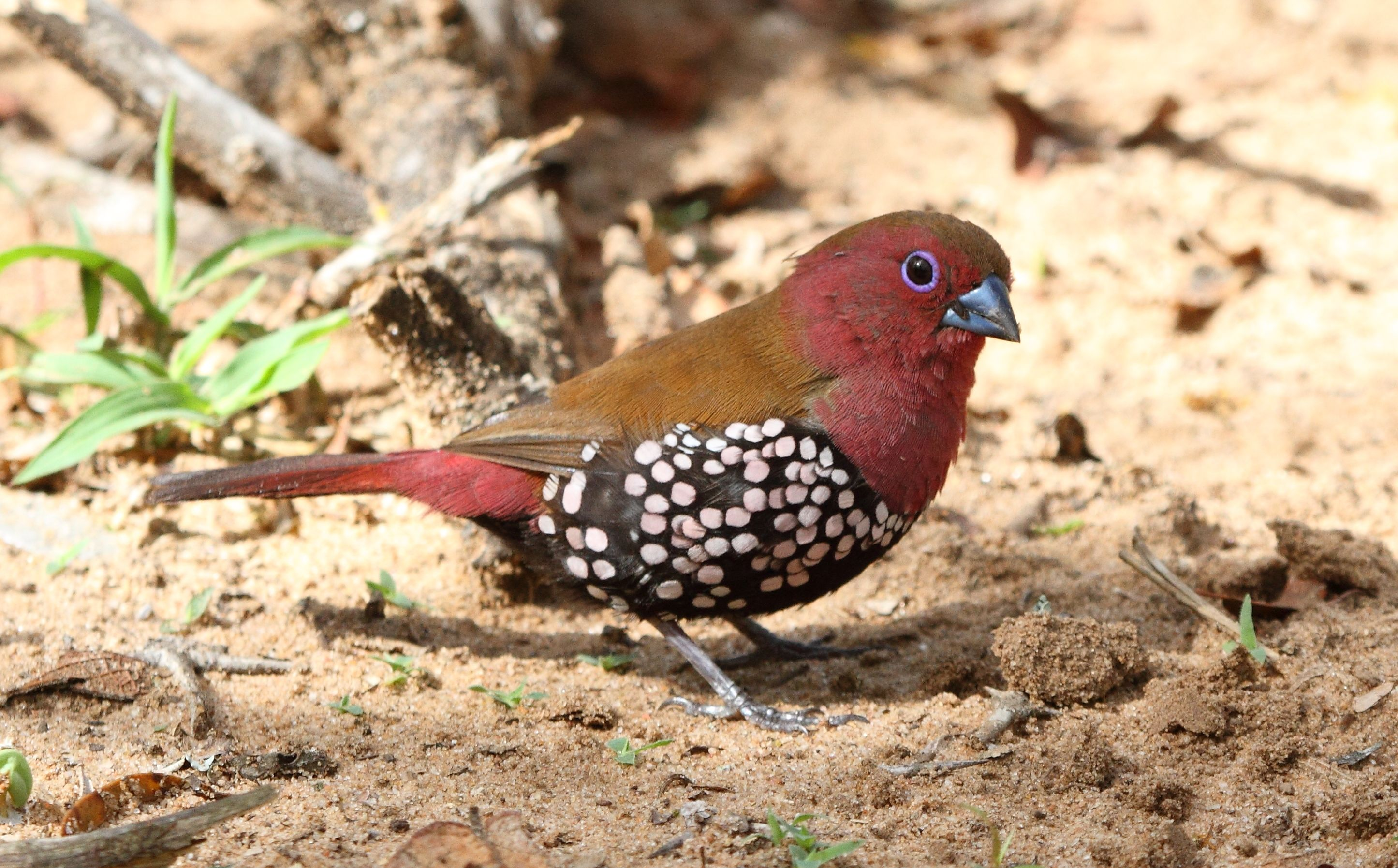
- Pink-throated twinspot (Hyapargos margaritatus)

Scientific classification
- Kingdom: Animalia
- Phylum: Chordata
- Class: Aves
- Order: Passeriformes
- Family: Estrildidae
- Genus: Hypargos; Reichenbach, 1862

Type species
- Spermophaga margargaritata pink-throated twinspot Strickland, 1844

Species
- See text.

= Hypargos =

Genus of birds

Hypargos is a genus of small seed-eating birds in the family Estrildidae that are found in Sub-Saharan Africa.

There are species with the common name of twinspot in other genera within the Estrildidae family.

== Taxonomy ==
The genus Hypargos was introduced in 1862 by the German naturalist Ludwig Reichenbach to accommodate the pink-throated twinspot. The name combines the Ancient Greek hypo meaning "beneath" with Argos from Argus Panoptes, the many-eyed giant in Greek mythology. The genus Hypargos is sister to the genus Euschistospiza which contains two more species with "twinspot" in their common name.

=== Species ===
The genus contains the following two species:

Genus Hypargos – Reichenbach, 1862 – two species
Common name	Scientific name and subspecies	Range	Size and ecology	IUCN status and estimated population
Red-throated twinspot	Hypargos niveoguttatus (Peters, W, 1868)	Angola, Burundi, The Democratic Republic of the Congo, Kenya, Malawi, Mozambique, Namibia, Rwanda, Somalia, South Africa, Tanzania, Zambia & Zimbabwe	Size: Habitat: Diet:	LC
Pink-throated twinspot Male Female	Hypargos margaritatus (Strickland, 1844)	Mozambique, South Africa and Swaziland	Size: Habitat: Diet:	LC
