= Diang Chiefdom =

Diang
- Chiefdom
- Country: Sierra Leone
- Province: Northern Province
- District: Koinadugu District
- Capital: Kondembaia

Population (2004)
  - Total: 19,700
- Time zone: UTC+0 (GMT)

Diang is a chiefdom in Koinadugu District of Sierra Leone with a population of 19,700. Its principal town is Kondembaia. Lake Sonfon is located in the chiefdom an inland mountain lake of religious and cultural significance. There are two ruling houses namely, Ferekeya and Magbaia for the Paramount Chieftency in Diang Chiefdom. Ferenke and Magba are brothers from the same father and Ferenkeh was the eldest son. After the death of their father, Ferenkeh been the eldest son was automatically crowned as the next ruler of the Kingdom. At the initial ruling of Ferenkeh, Magba the youngest son was very respectful and obedient to his brother but things became sour as their differences grew wider as a result of certain decisions made by Ferenkeh. On this background, Ferenkeh sees Magba as someone who is disrespectful and disobedient, above all, someone who undermines decisions and challenged his authority. Ferenkeh was left with no option but to asked Magba out off the Palace, which never came as a surprise to Magba.Magba left the Palace and established his own settlement few kilometers from the Palace. Upon the death of Ferenkeh, Magba was crowned the next ruler. This is how the two ruling houses came to being.
