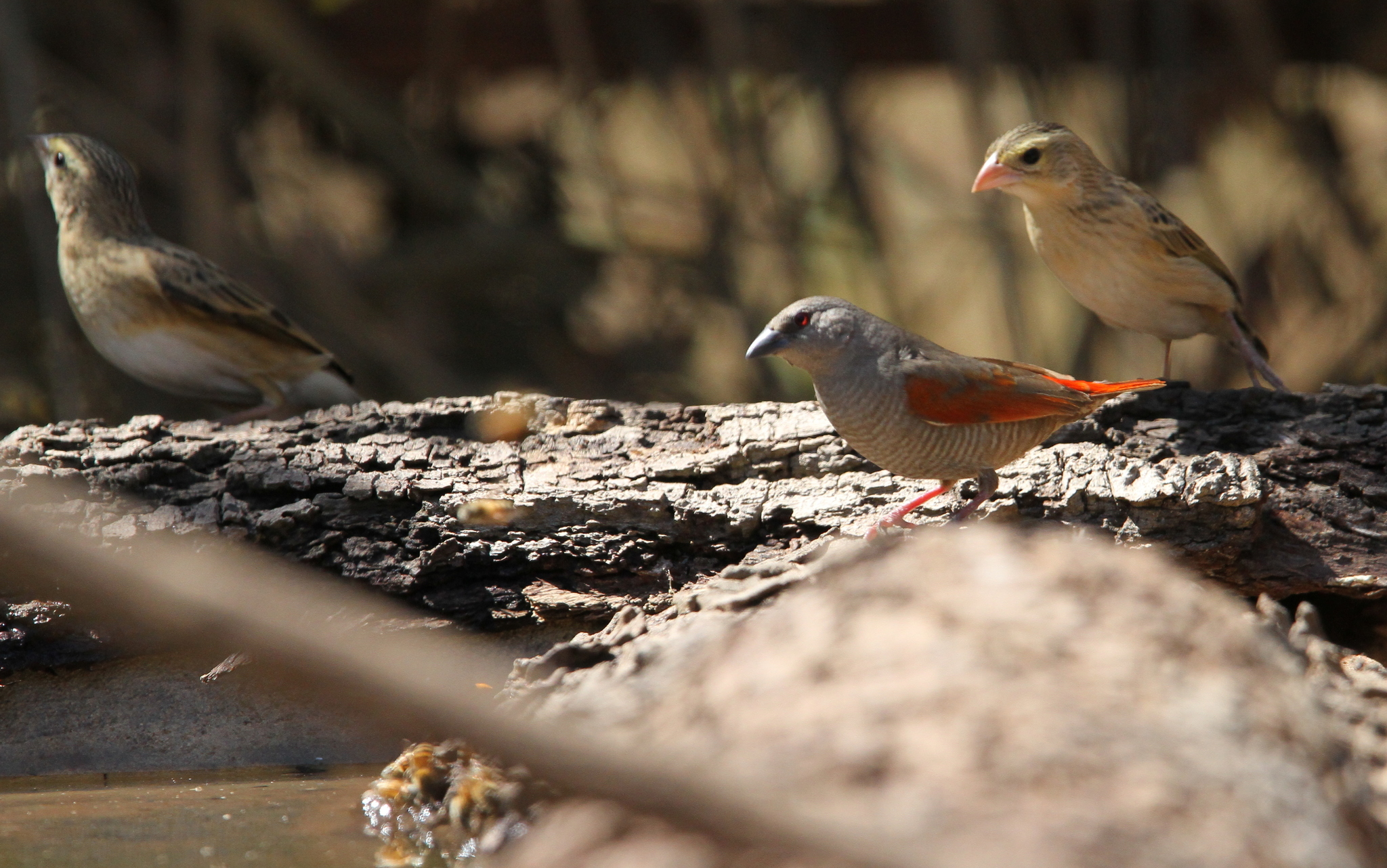

Conservation status
- Least Concern (IUCN 3.1)

Scientific classification
- Kingdom: Animalia
- Phylum: Chordata
- Class: Aves
- Order: Passeriformes
- Family: Estrildidae
- Genus: Pytilia
- Species: P. phoenicoptera

Binomial name
- Pytilia phoenicoptera Swainson, 1837

= Red-winged pytilia =

Species of bird

The red-winged pytilia (Pytilia phoenicoptera) is a common species of estrildid finch found in Africa. It has an estimated global extent of occurrence of 370,000 km^{2} (140,000 sq mi).

It is found at Benin, Burkina Faso, Cameroon, Central African Republic, Chad, The Democratic Republic of the Congo, Côte d'Ivoire, Ethiopia, Gambia, Ghana, Guinea, Guinea-Bissau, Mali, Niger, Nigeria, Senegal, Sierra Leone, Sudan, Togo and Uganda. The IUCN has classified the species as being of least concern.

The red-billed pytilia (Pytilia lineata) was recently split from this species.
