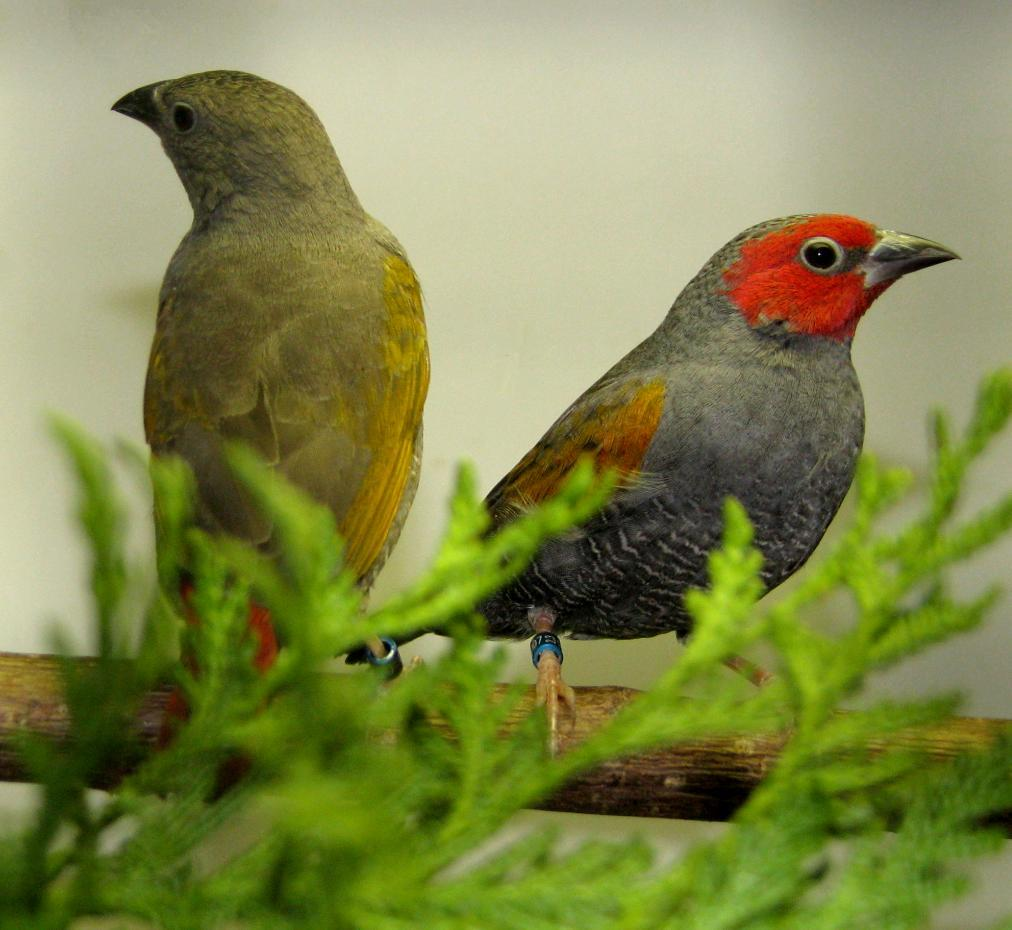

Conservation status
- Least Concern (IUCN 3.1)

Scientific classification
- Kingdom: Animalia
- Phylum: Chordata
- Class: Aves
- Order: Passeriformes
- Family: Estrildidae
- Genus: Pytilia
- Species: P. hypogrammica

Binomial name
- Pytilia hypogrammica Sharpe, 1870

= Yellow-winged pytilia =

Species of bird

The yellow-winged pytilia (Pytilia hypogrammica), also known as the red-faced pytilia, is an African estrildid finch.

== Distribution ==
The finch has an estimated global extent of occurrence of 250,000 km^{2} (97,000 sq mi). It is sparsely distributed across West Africa, from Guinea to far north-western Democratic Republic of the Congo.
