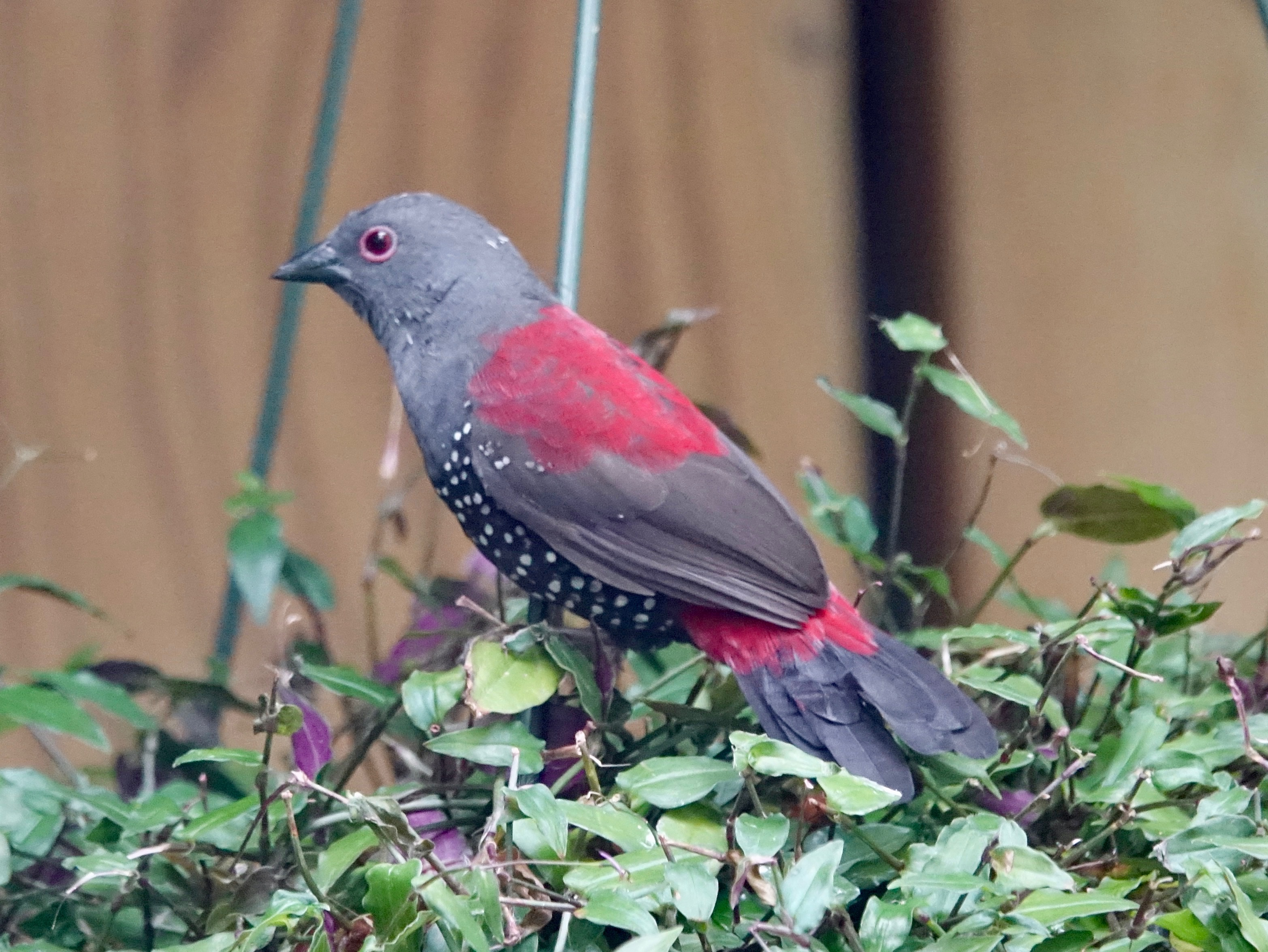

Conservation status
- Least Concern (IUCN 3.1)

Scientific classification
- Kingdom: Animalia
- Phylum: Chordata
- Class: Aves
- Order: Passeriformes
- Family: Estrildidae
- Genus: Euschistospiza
- Species: E. dybowskii

Binomial name
- Euschistospiza dybowskii (Oustalet, 1892)

= Dybowski's twinspot =

Species of bird

Dybowski's twinspot (Euschistospiza dybowskii) is a common species of estrildid finch found in Africa. It has an estimated global extent of occurrence of 450,000 km^{2}.

It is found in Cameroon, Central African Republic, Chad, The Democratic Republic of the Congo, Côte d'Ivoire, Guinea, Liberia, Nigeria, Senegal, Sierra Leone, South Sudan and Uganda. The status of the species is evaluated as Least Concern.

The name of this bird commemorates the French botanist Jean Dybowski.
