= Hans Edmund Wolters =

German ornithologist

Hans Edmund Wolters (11 February 1915 – 22 December 1991) was a German ornithologist from Duisburg. In 1960, he became an associate member of the Alexander Koenig Zoological Research Institute and Museum in Bonn. He became head of the museum's Department of Ornithology in 1973. He was one of the first European ornithologists to use a cladistic classification. This is reflected in his main work Die Vogelarten der Erde (The Bird Taxa of the World).
