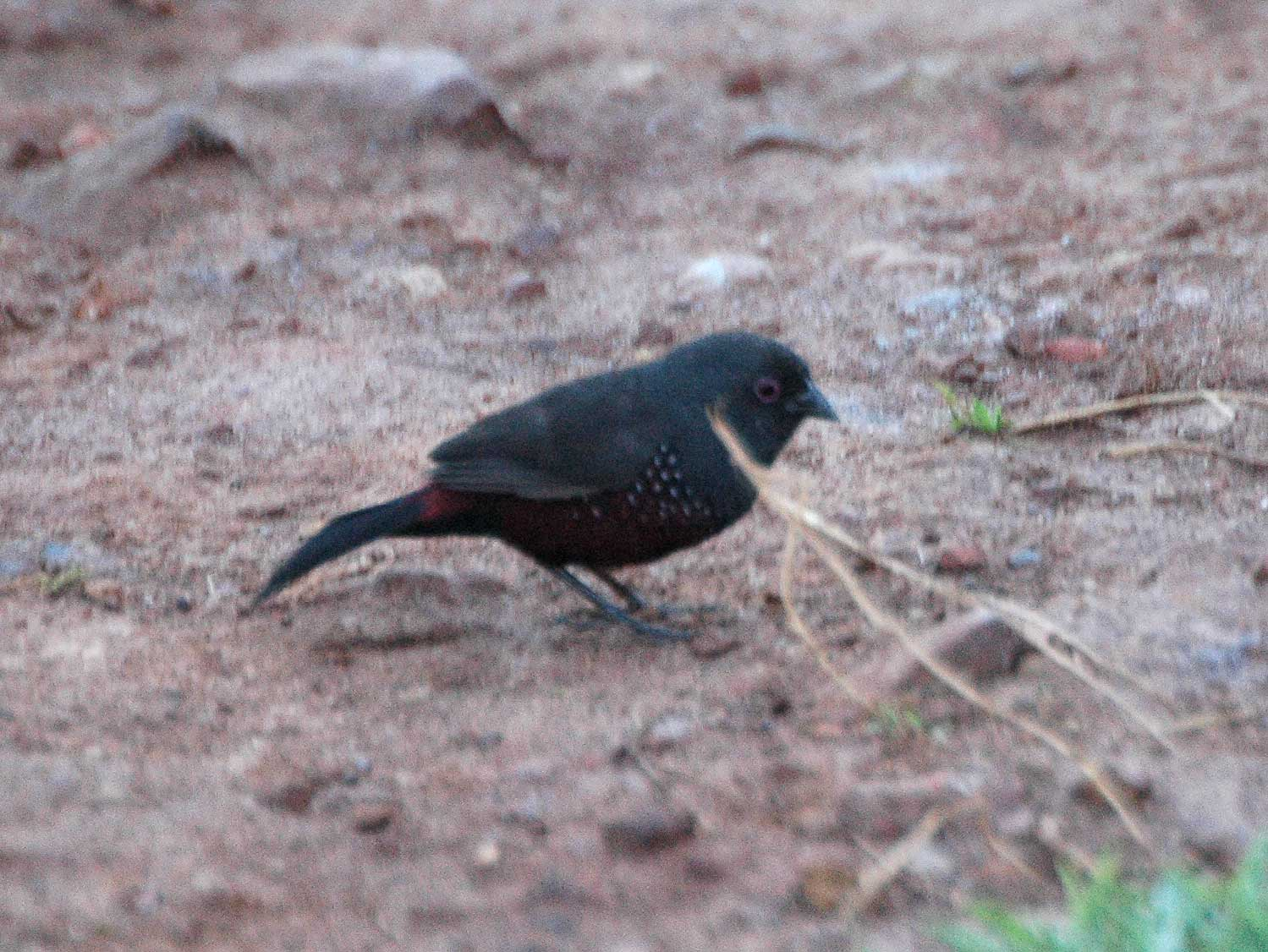

Scientific classification
- Kingdom: Animalia
- Phylum: Chordata
- Class: Aves
- Order: Passeriformes
- Family: Estrildidae
- Genus: Euschistospiza; Wolters, 1943

Type species
- Lagonosticta cinereovinacea de Sousa, 1889

= Euschistospiza =

Genus of birds

Euschistospiza is a genus of birds in the family Estrildidae, found in Sub-Saharan Africa.

== Taxonomy ==
The genus Euschistospiza was introduced in 1943 by the German ornithologist Hans Edmund Wolters with Lagonosticta cineriovinacea Sousa, the dusky twinspot, as the type species. The genus name combines the Ancient Greek ευ/eu meaning "fine", the Late Latin schistus meaning "slate" and the Ancient Greek σπιζα/spiza meaning "finch".

== Species ==
The genus contains the following two species:

Genus Euschistospiza – Wolters, 1943 – two species
Common name	Scientific name and subspecies	Range	Size and ecology	IUCN status and estimated population
Dybowski's twinspot	Euschistospiza dybowskii (Oustalet, 1892)	Cameroon, Central African Republic, Chad, The Democratic Republic of the Congo, Côte d'Ivoire, Guinea, Liberia, Nigeria, Senegal, Sierra Leone, South Sudan and Uganda.	Size: Habitat: Diet:	LC
Dusky twinspot	Euschistospiza cinereovinacea (Sousa, 1889)	Angola and the Albertine Rift montane forests	Size: Habitat: Diet:	LC
