= Phillip Clancey =

Scottish-South African ornithologist (1917–2001)

Phillip Alexander Clancey (26 September 1917 – 18 July 2001) was a leading authority on the ornithology of South Africa.

== Background and education ==
Phillip Clancey was born, brought up and educated in Glasgow, Scotland. He studied at the Glasgow School of Art where his artistic skills were developed.

== Military service ==
Clancey served in the 51st (Highland) Division with the Allied forces in Sicily and Italy during World War II, narrowly escaping death and being deafened in one ear by an artillery explosion.

Following his death in 2001, Clancey's military medals, together with his "Gill Memorial Medal" were auctioned by City Coins, Cape Town, in 2006, on behalf of the Clancey Estate. These medals, including the Gill Memorial Medal were purchased on the auction by David R. Bennett - Chairman of the Durban Natural Science Museum Trust, and the medals now form part of the Bennett Military Medal Collection.

Clancey's group of six military medals are to (Service Number) 913613 Gunner P.A. Clancey, Royal Artillery: 1939-45 Star; Italy Star; 1939-45 Defence Medal; 1939-45 War Medal; Efficiency Medal, Territorial (GviR, t.B) and the Coronation Medal, 1953, (EiiR).

== Expeditions ==
In 1948–1949, he accompanied Colonel Richard Meinertzhagen on an ornithological expedition to Yemen, Aden, Somalia, Ethiopia, Kenya and South Africa.

== Museum posts ==
Clancey emigrated to South Africa in August 1950 to take up the post of Curator of the Natal Museum in Pietermaritzburg.

He was Director of the Durban Museum and Art Gallery from 1 January 1952 until his retirement on 25 September 1982.

Clancey also served as President of the Southern African Museums Association, President of the Southern African Ornithological Society and President of the Natal Bird Club.

== Books ==
Clancey wrote extensively about the taxonomy of African birds, naming some two-hundred subspecies of Southern African birds.

- The Birds of Natal and Zululand (1964);
- The Gamebirds of Southern Africa (1967);
- Catalogue of the Birds of the South African Subregion (1965–1972);
- Handlist of the Birds of Southern Mozambique (1970–1972);
- Co-author of Vol II of Atlas of Speciation of African Birds (1978);
- Chief Editor of the S.A.O.S. Checklist of Southern African Birds (1980);
- The Rare Birds of Southern Africa (1985);
- Kingfishers of Sub-Saharan Africa, Publisher: Jonathan Ball Publishers (31 December 1992)

ISBN 0-947464-65-4 ISBN 978-0947464653

- The Birds of Southern Mozambique. Publisher: African Bird Book Publishing;

2 Rev Ed edition (January 1996) ISBN 0-620-19918-0 ISBN 978-0620199186

- Contributed to The Atlas of Southern African Birds (1997).

Other publications number approximately 600.

== Awards and honours ==
- Doctor of Science (DSc), University of Natal;
- Gill Memorial Medal of the Southern African Ornithological Society (now BirdLife South Africa). The Gill Memorial Medal, first awarded in 1960 by the South African Orinthological Society (now Birdlife South Africa) is awarded for 'Services to Ornithology South of the Zambezi' and has only been awarded twenty-two times between 1960 and 2016. Clancey was the fifth recipient of the award, in 1972;
- Fellowship of the Museums Association, London (for his work as a museologist);
- Honorary Life Member of the Southern African Ornithological Society (for his ornithological contributions);
- Several avian sub-species have been named after Clancey by others in his honour.
- The PA Clancey Gallery at the Durban Museum and Art Gallery is named after him.

== Collections ==
- Clancey donated a collection of some 5,500 bird-skins (mainly Western Palaearctic) to the National Museum of Scotland in Edinburgh;
- He also donated over 32,000 bird-skins - a collection considered the finest in Africa - to the Durban Museum and Art Gallery.

== Later life ==
Phillip Clancey continued as a Research Associate of the Durban Museum and Art Gallery until his death in 2001, aged 83.
