= Oti Valley Faunal Reserve =

Protected area in Togo

Coordinates: 10°35′N 0°40′E

The Oti Valley Faunal Reserve is a protected area in northeastern Togo, one of four Important Bird Areas (IBA) in the country.

== Geography ==
The site is mainly savanna and seasonally inundated floodplains on either side of the Oti River. It has a total area of 147,840 hectares (365,300 acres) and is located at 10°35'N and 0°40'E.

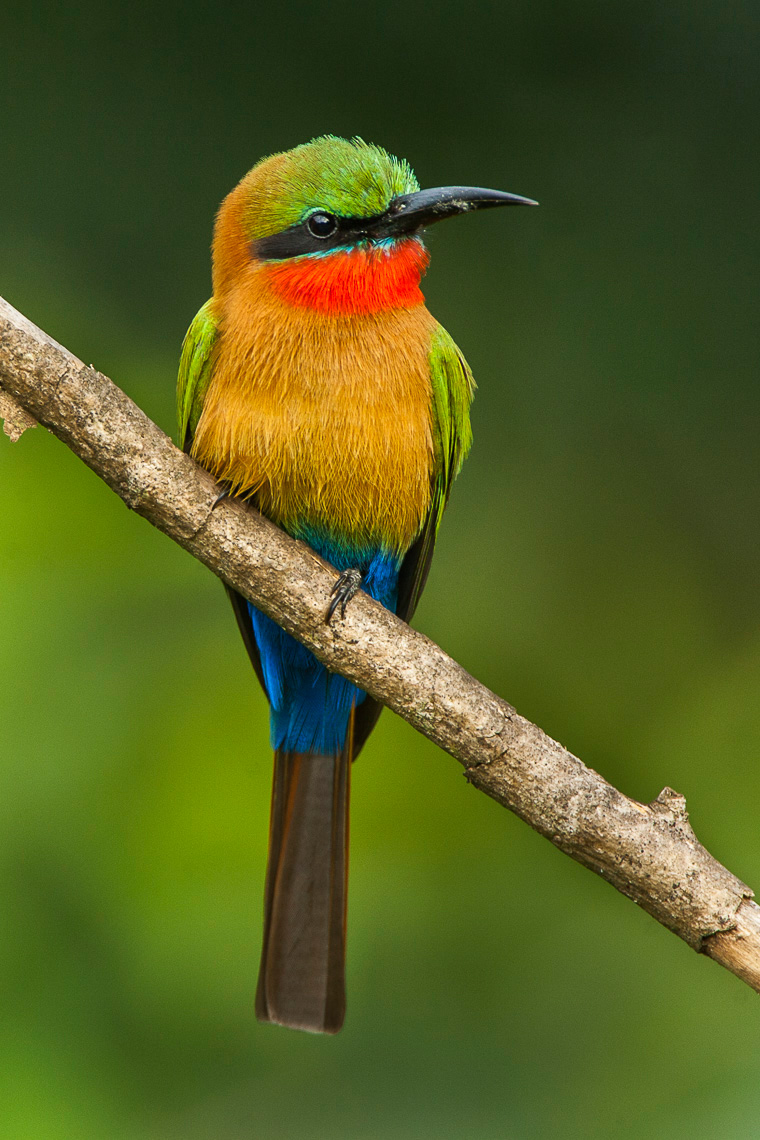
The red-throated bee-eater occurs in the reserve

== Environment ==
The site is in the Savanes Region of northeastern Togo, extending from the border with Burkina Faso and Benin, southwards to the edge of the Kéran National Park, another IBA, just to the east of the city of Sansanné-Mango. The grassland is largely composed of Andropogon, Heteropogon and Hyparrhenia species, with a scattering of Borassus aethiopum. In the gallery forests by the watercourses, Diospyros mespiliformis and Anogeissus leiocarpa predominate, along with the lower-growing Mimosa pigra and Mitragyna inermis. There are also pockets of Sudanian Savanna, with Acacia species, Combretum species, Tamarindus indica and Balanites aegyptiaca.

=== Fauna ===
Birds typical of the Sudan–Guinea Savanna biome found here include the fox kestrel, Senegal parrot, violet turaco, red-throated bee-eater, bearded barbet, sun lark, yellow-billed shrike, blackcap babbler, green-backed eremomela, splendid sunbird, black-rumped waxbill, Sahel bush sparrow, Heuglin's masked weaver, purple starling, piapiac, Narina trogon and Oriole warbler.

Wetland birds visiting the reserve include the black crowned crane, grey heron, white stork, spur-winged goose and collared pratincole. The saddle-billed stork breeds here and the white-backed night heron is an occasional visitor. Additionally, the pallid harrier and the great snipe have been recorded at the reserve, and the red-fronted gazelle, rated as "vulnerable" by the IUCN, is also present.

=== Conservation ===
Despite being listed as a faunal reserve, the area is threatened by illegal settlements, poaching and the gathering of firewood. The flow of the river may also vary because of the construction of a dam upstream in Burkina Faso. In addition, in 2008 the Bassin versant Oti-Mandouri was designated as a Ramsar site, a wetland habitat of international importance.
