= Wildlife of Togo =

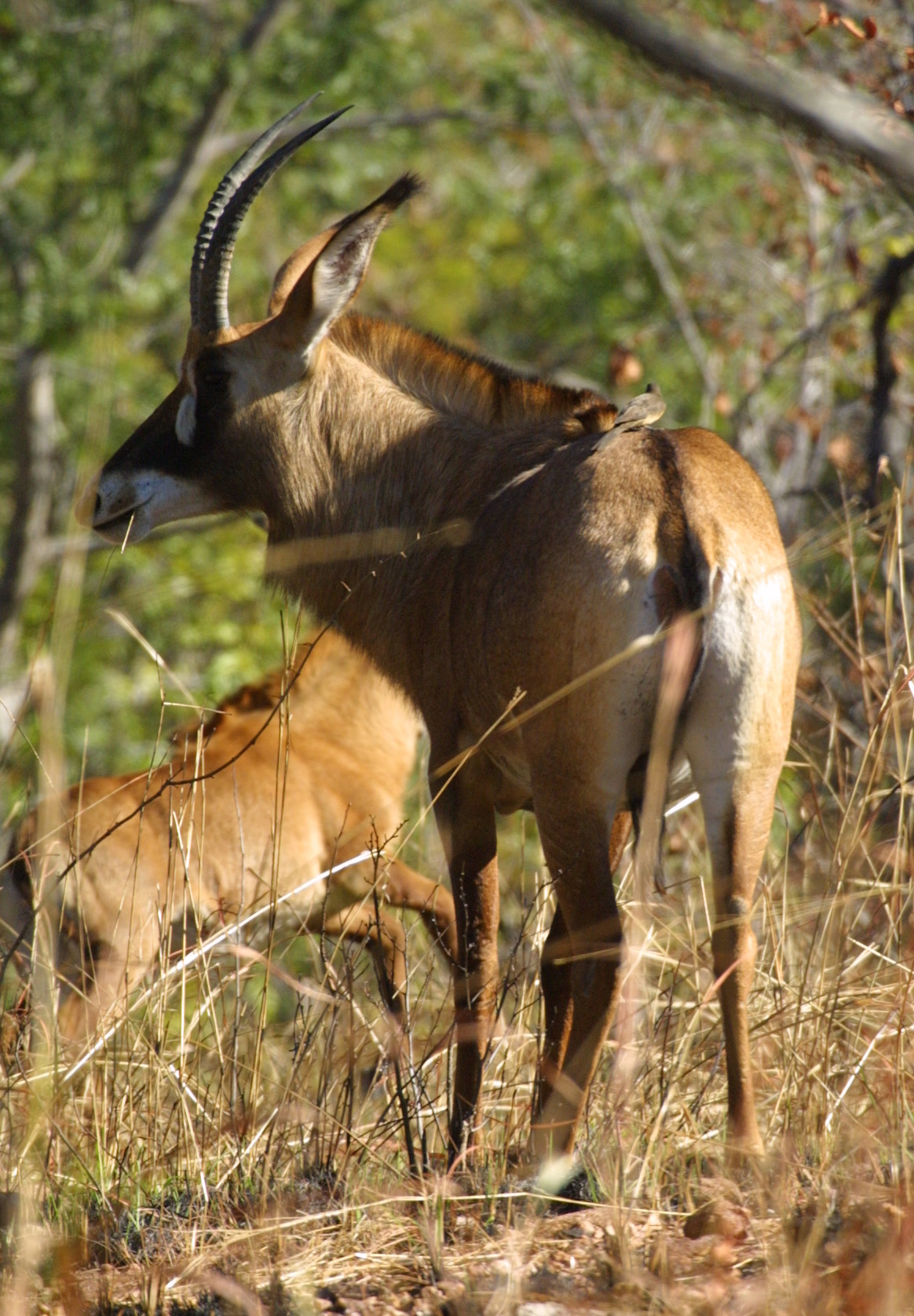
Roan antelope

The wildlife of Togo is composed of the flora and fauna of Togo, a country in West Africa. Despite its small size the country has a diversity of habitats; there are only remnants of the once more extensive rain forests in the south, there is Sudanian savanna in the north-western part of the country and larger areas of Guinean forest–savanna mosaic in the centre and north-east. The climate is tropical with distinct wet and dry seasons. There are estimated to be over 3000 species of vascular plants in the country, and 196 species of mammals and 676 species of birds have been recorded there.

== Geography ==
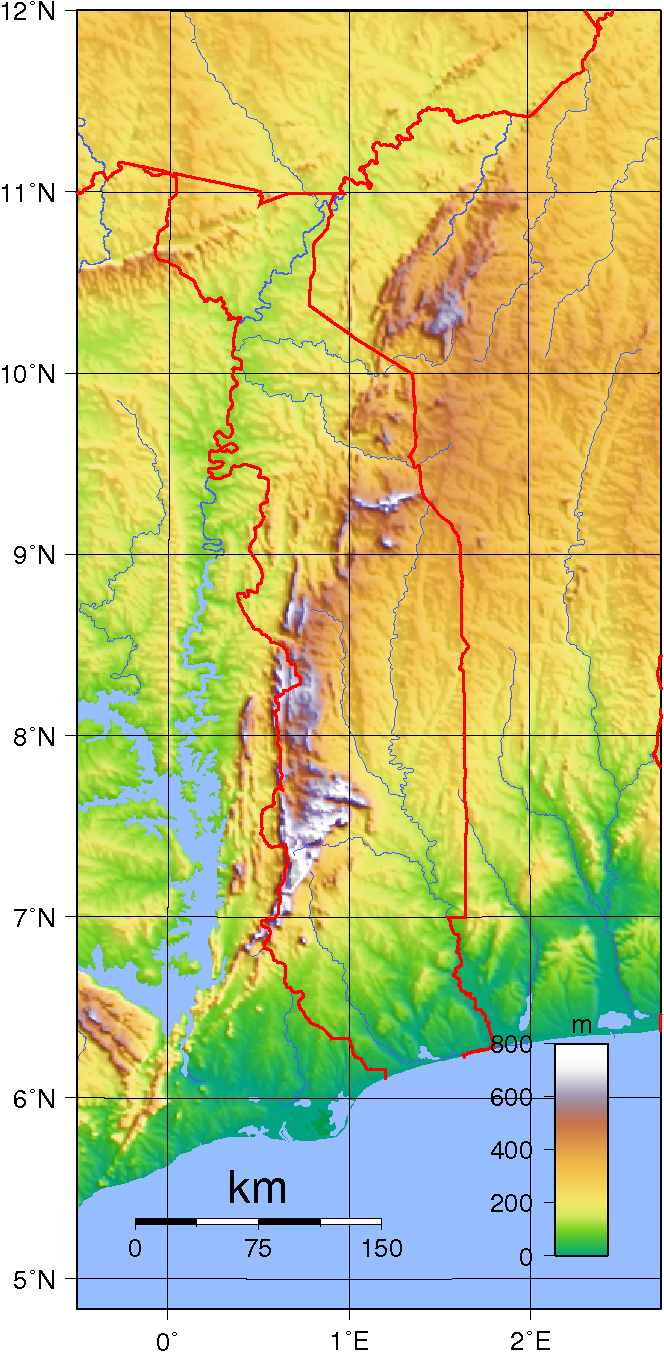
Topography of Togo

Togo is a small, elongated country in West Africa, located between Ghana to the west, Burkina Faso to the north, Benin to the east and an 80 km (50 mi) coastline on the Gulf of Guinea to the south. Most of the country is below 500 m (1,640 ft), with mountain ridges running across the centre from the Togo Mountains in the south-west to upland areas in the north-east. These mountains consist of plateaus separated by steep-sided valleys giving a rugged terrain. To the north lies the Oti Plateau. Drainage is via the Oti and Mono rivers which flow in broad valleys with flood plains. The coastal area has a network of sandbars, lakes and lagoons which separate the coastal plains from the sea. Togo lies in the Dahomey Gap, an area of savannah grassland that separates the Upper Guinean forests which lie to the west from the Lower Guinean forests which lie further east.

The climate is generally tropical with average temperatures ranging from 27 °C (81 °F) on the coast to about 30 °C (86 °F) in the northernmost regions, where there is a drier climate and grassy plains. To the south there are two seasons of rain, the first between April and July and the second between September and November, with an average rainfall of 1,000 to 1,400 mm (39 to 55 in). The climate is humid for seven months of the year, but the dry desert winds of the harmattan blow from November to March, bringing cooler weather.

== Conservation ==
Historically, throughout the continent of Africa, wildlife populations have been shrinking rapidly owing to habitat destruction, logging, civil wars, hunting, poaching, pollution, mining and other human activities. The problems in Togo have included destruction of native vegetation and the resulting loss of soil through erosion, the drying up of watercourses through damming and water extraction, pollution of various sorts and the increasing risk of floods and droughts due to climate change.

National parks and protected areas which have been set up in Togo to preserve the country's biodiversity include the Abdoulaye Faunal Reserve, the Fazao Malfakassa National Park, the Fosse aux Lions National Park, the Oti Valley Faunal Reserve and the Kéran National Park. When these were established, the local population had not been consulted and did not understand why they should not continue utilizing natural resources in their traditional way, and during political turmoil in the 1990s, there were attacks against the protected areas accompanied by the mass-slaughter of animals, resulting in a major impact on the environment.

== Flora ==
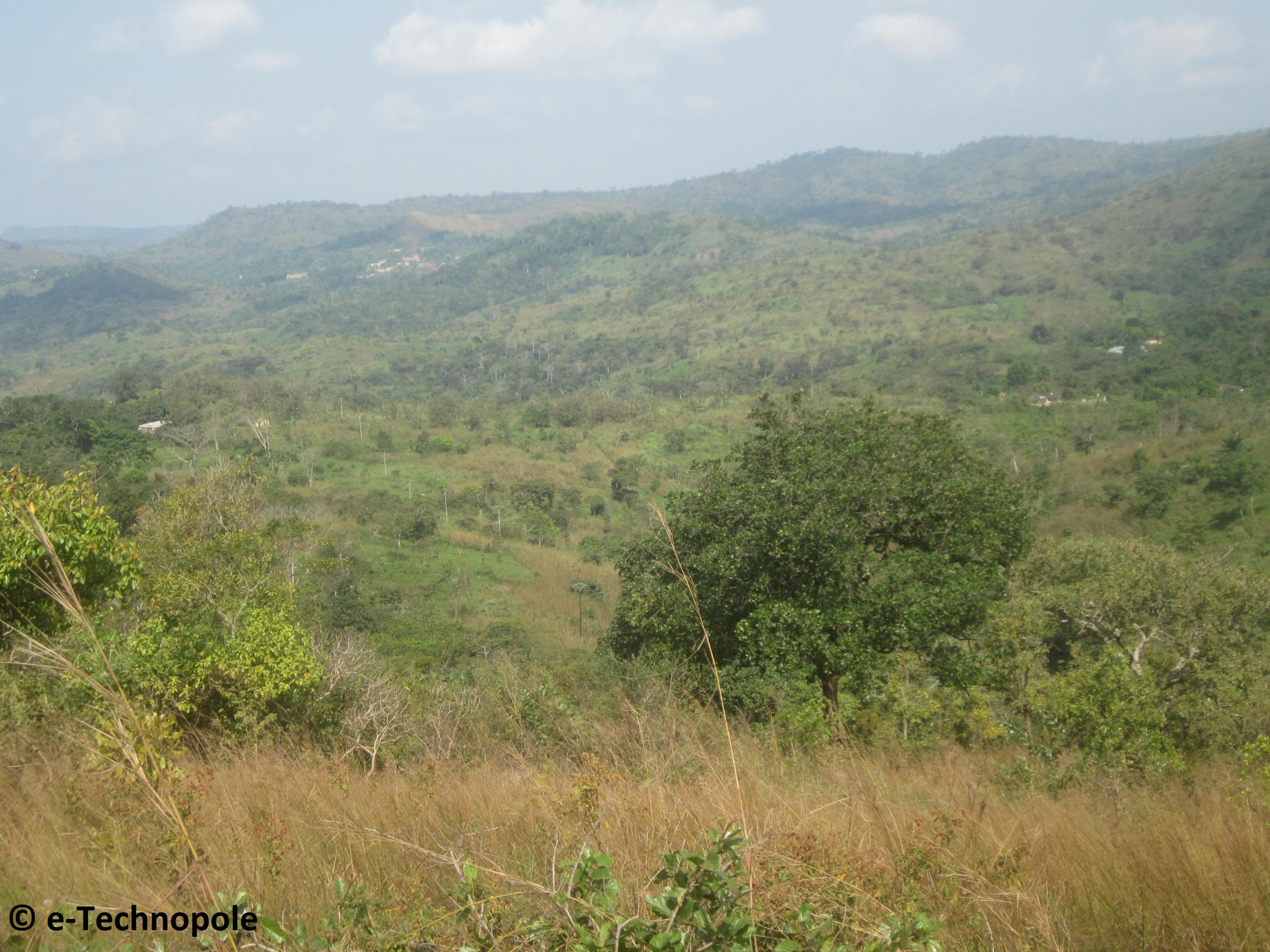
Guinean forest–savanna mosaic near Kpalimé

Some 2,500 species of vascular plant were included in the flora of Togo in 1984, and at least 235 species having been added since then. Including introduced plants that have become naturalized, it is estimated that there are 3,450 species in the country, however the flora is still incompletely known.

The natural vegetation varies, with tropical savannah occurring in the centre and north of the country, moist semi-evergreen forests in the mountainous areas, and mangrove forests near the coast. As the country is densely populated, only remnants of the forests survive outside of national parks and reserves. The Oti Plateau and some mountainous areas retain more of their natural vegetation than elsewhere. The forest belt found in some neighbouring countries has largely been destroyed, and the Guinean forest–savanna mosaic ecoregion, consisting largely of grassland, interspersed with woodland on steep slopes and besides watercourses, stretches all the way to the coast. This results in the Dahomey Gap between the Upper Guinean forests to the west and the Lower Guinean forests to the east. The coastal zone consists of lagoons, creeks and ponds and the forest here is dominated by red and black mangroves. This area has been designated as a Ramsar site of international importance to wetland birds.

== Fauna ==
=== Mammals ===
196 species of mammal have been recorded in Togo. Many of the larger mammals have become increasingly scarce or disappeared entirely from unprotected areas of the country. This is particularly so for forest species, while antelopes in the northern savannahs have survived better. The leopard, chimpanzee and giant eland are probably extirpated from the country while the lion, African wild dog, bongo, sitatunga, Diana monkey, western red colobus, black colobus, king colobus and manatee are at high risk of extirpation, and the African elephant population has fallen to a critical level. Savannah antelope species include the bushbuck, Maxwell's duiker, red-flanked duiker, black duiker, yellow-backed duiker, common duiker, bohor reedbuck, waterbuck, Buffon's kob, roan antelope, western hartebeest, red-fronted gazelle and oribi.

Mammals recorded in Kéran National Park in 2008 included the olive baboon, tantalus monkey, patas monkey, kob, waterbuck, red-flanked duiker, common duiker, African buffalo, hippopotamus, warthog, crested porcupine, striped ground squirrel and four-toed hedgehog. Among smaller animals, the Togo mole rat occurs in the north-west of the country and the neighbouring parts of Ghana, and the Togo mouse is known only from two specimens captured in 1890 and may be extinct. Additionally, there are about ten species of fruit bat.

=== Birds ===
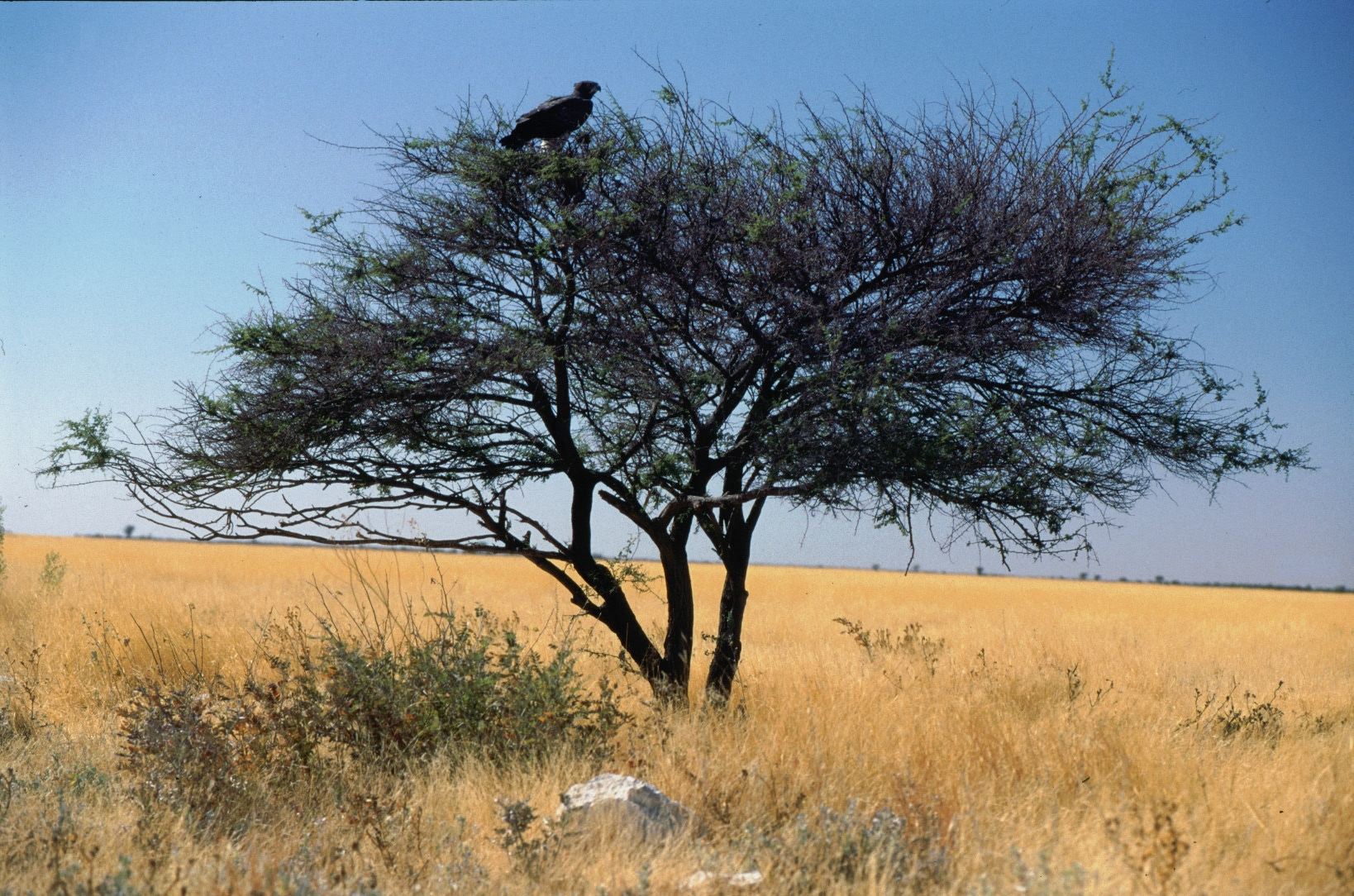
Martial eagles tend to be attracted to thorn trees in open savannah.

Some 676 species of bird have been recorded in Togo, including 18 globally threatened species. The birds include sea birds, wetland birds and terrestrial species, some resident and others migratory, either overwintering in the country or passing through, while a few are accidentals. About 408 species are thought to be resident and breeding in the country, about 109 are Palearctic migrants and a further 80 or so are migrants within Africa. The coastal wetlands at Zones Humides du Littoral du Togo are used by waders and terns migrating along the west coast of Africa. The common house martin overwinters in the north of the country and the common, alpine and mottled swift all pass through on their migrations. The greatest diversity of forest birds occurs in the south-west, near the border with Ghana. The four Important Bird Areas are the Oti Valley Faunal Reserve, the Kéran National Park, the Fazao Malfakassa National Park and the Misahöhe Forest Reserve. Several species of vulture, the martial eagle, tawny eagle, secretarybird, black crowned crane, brown-cheeked hornbill and yellow-casqued hornbill are all rare or threatened, while the Togo paradise whydah is common.

=== Reptiles and amphibians ===
The West African crocodile and the West African slender-snouted crocodile are two of the 107 species of reptile that have been recorded in the country. Three species of marine turtle visit the coast, the leatherback, the hawksbill and the green sea turtle, and inland there are freshwater turtles, tortoises, snakes, lizards and chameleons. Additionally, ten species of amphibian occur in Togo, including three which are endemic to the country.
