= German Cemetery of Mango =

- View of the German Cemetery of Mango
- Interactive map of German Cemetery of Mango

Details
- Location: Mango, Savanes Region
- Country: Togo
- Coordinates: 10.360239°N 0.483800°E

The German Cemetery of Mango is a historic cemetery in Mango, in the Savanes Region of Togo. It contains the graves of three German soldiers who died in the late 19th century during the period of German Togoland.

The cemetery is listed among Togo's protected historic and cultural sites.

== History ==
The cemetery is associated with the German colonial presence in northern Togo. Three German soldiers are buried there: Wilhelm Bierwerth, Henrich Werner and Theodor Heitman. They were stationed at Sansaanné, present-day Mango, and died in 1896 and 1899.

The cemetery was renovated in 1990.

== Commemoration ==
On 18 November 2012, German ambassador to Togo Joseph Weiss visited the cemetery and laid a wreath at the graves of the soldiers. The ceremony was attended by Togolese and German representatives and senior officers of the Togolese Armed Forces.

== Heritage status ==
The German Cemetery of Mango is included in Togo's official inventory of historic and cultural sites. The 2017 listing also includes several other sites associated with the German colonial period in Mango, including the German well, former customs building, bridge over the Oti River and former German post office.

The municipality of Oti 1 also lists the cemetery among the historic and tourist sites of Mango.

== See also ==
- History of Togo
- German Togoland
- Mango, Togo
- Savanes Region, Togo
