= Fazao Malfakassa National Park =

National park in Togo

- Parc national de Fazao Malfakassa
- IUCN category II (national park)
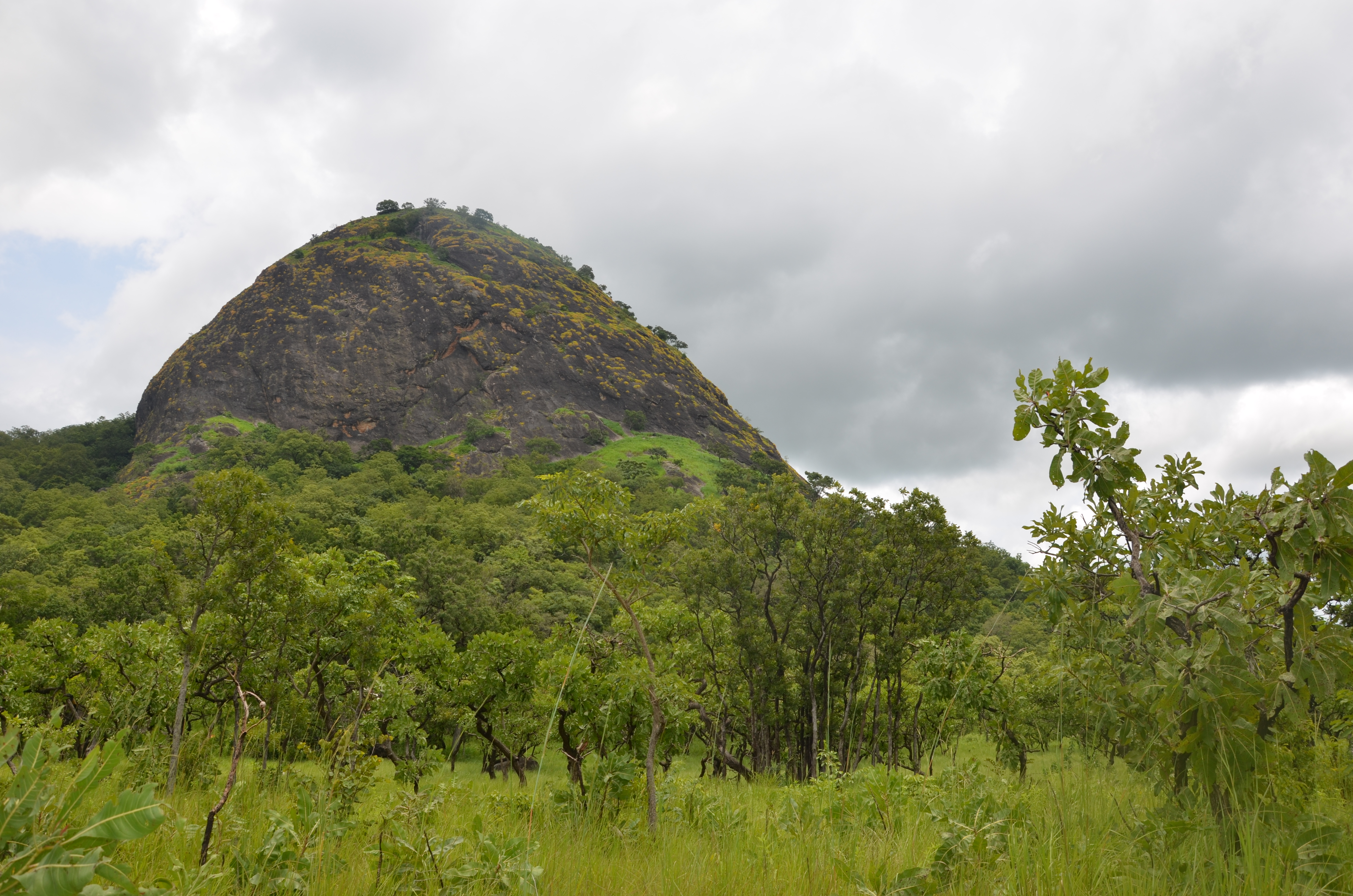
- View of the Fazao national park mountain

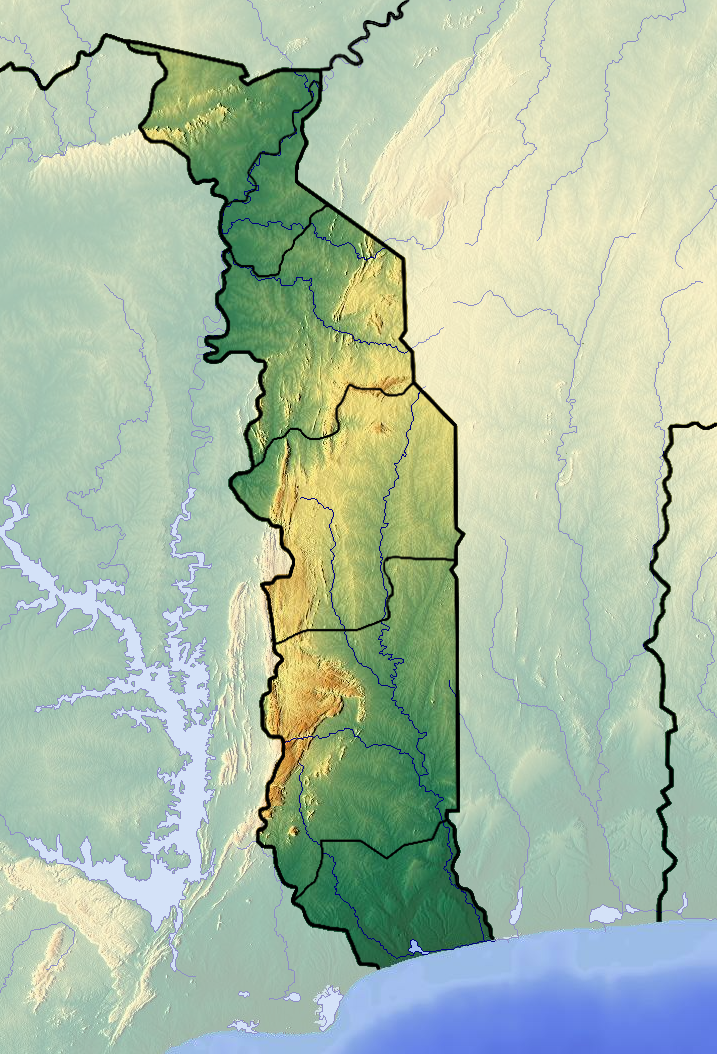
- Location within Togo
- Interactive map of Fazao Malfakassa National Park
- Location: Kara Region and Centrale Region Togo
- Nearest city: Sokode
- Coordinates: 9°N 1°E
- Area: 1,920 km^{2} (740 mi^{2})
- Established: 1975

Fazao Malfakassa National Park or Parc national de Fazao Malfakassa is the largest of three national parks in Togo, the others being Kéran and Fosse aux Lions. It is situated between the Kara Region and Centrale Region in semi-mountainous wetland, and forms part of the border with Ghana.

== History ==
The park was established in 1975 by the merger of two reserve forests created in 1951: Fazao (1,620 square kilometres [630 mi^{2}]) and Malfakassa (300 square kilometres [120 mi^{2}]).

The Fondation Franz Weber was authorized by the government to manage the park for 25 years, beginning in 1990 and ending in 2015.

The site is being considered for inclusion in the World Heritage list of sites with "outstanding universal value" to the world; it was added to the UNESCO World Heritage Tentative List on January 8, 2002, in the Mixed (Cultural + Natural) category.

== Environment ==
The Forest Classée Du Fazao contains most of the biodiversity of the forest, while visitors go hiking in the rocky hills of the Malfacassa Zone de Chasse. The terrain consists of "savanna woodland ... good stands of gallery forest ... , submontane forest and grass-covered hilltops".

=== Fauna ===
The total number of known bird species is 244, as of 2008, but there are likely many more. The park has been designated an Important Bird Area (IBA) by BirdLife International because it supports significant populations of many bird species.

Antelope species in the park, based on 1984 aerial surveys, include the:

- bushbuck
- Maxwell's duiker
- red-flanked duiker (est. 450)
- bay duiker
- yellow-backed duiker
- grey duiker (est. 450)
- waterbuck (est. 450)
- Buffon's kob (Kobus kob kob) (est. 3200)
- roan antelope (est. 200)
- western hartebeest (est. 100)
- oribi

==== Elephants ====
In 1990, elephants were common in northeastern Togo. With the country in a state of upheaval in the early 1990s, poaching became a major problem. By 2007, the population had been reduced to a remnant in the park. The number of elephants in the park was estimated to be around 50 in 2003. The park is one of two sites in Togo in the CITES Monitoring of Illegal Killing of Elephants Program.
