= Mango, Togo =

Mango
- Location in Togo
- Coordinates: 10°21′20″N 0°28′32″E
- Country: Togo
- Region: Savanes Region

Population (2007)
  - Total: 41,464

Mango, formerly Sansanné-Mango, is a city in northern Togo. It is situated on the Oti River in the Savanes Region. The town is located near Kéran National Park and 26 kilometres (16 mi) from the border with Ghana. The population is about 41,464 people (2007).

== History ==
Sansanne-Mango lay on an important trade route linking the Ashanti Empire to Salaga and ultimately to the Hausa States.

Louis-Gustave Binger visited the town in August 1888. He noted that members of the Traore clan had been present in the area since before the town's founding, indicating that it was relatively young and founded by Mande speakers..

== Economy ==
The town is a trading center for cattle and peanuts.

== Transportation ==
The town lies on the main north–south road (Route Nationale No. 1) in Togo.

== Demography ==
The town is mainly inhabited by Chakosi people.

== Health ==
In 2014, the Association of Baptists for World Evangelism constructed a hospital (Hospital of Hope) in Mango and it opened the facility in Feb 2015.

== Climate ==
Climate data for Mango (Sansanné-Mango Airport) 1991-2020, extremes 1941-present
| Month | Jan | Feb | Mar | Apr | May | Jun | Jul | Aug | Sep | Oct | Nov | Dec | Year |
|---|---|---|---|---|---|---|---|---|---|---|---|---|---|
| Record high °C (°F) | 40.9 (105.6) | 43.4 (110.1) | 44.0 (111.2) | 42.1 (107.8) | 41.0 (105.8) | 38.0 (100.4) | 36.0 (96.8) | 34.2 (93.6) | 34.4 (93.9) | 37.2 (99.0) | 39.0 (102.2) | 39.6 (103.3) | 44.0 (111.2) |
| Mean daily maximum °C (°F) | 35.9 (96.6) | 38.2 (100.8) | 39.9 (103.8) | 38.4 (101.1) | 35.9 (96.6) | 33.4 (92.1) | 31.7 (89.1) | 31.2 (88.2) | 32.2 (90.0) | 35.0 (95.0) | 37.4 (99.3) | 36.4 (97.5) | 35.5 (95.9) |
| Daily mean °C (°F) | 28.1 (82.6) | 30.4 (86.7) | 32.9 (91.2) | 32.4 (90.3) | 30.5 (86.9) | 28.5 (83.3) | 27.4 (81.3) | 27.0 (80.6) | 27.5 (81.5) | 28.9 (84.0) | 29.1 (84.4) | 27.9 (82.2) | 29.2 (84.6) |
| Mean daily minimum °C (°F) | 19.8 (67.6) | 22.6 (72.7) | 26.0 (78.8) | 26.4 (79.5) | 25.1 (77.2) | 23.7 (74.7) | 23.1 (73.6) | 22.9 (73.2) | 22.7 (72.9) | 22.7 (72.9) | 20.9 (69.6) | 19.5 (67.1) | 22.9 (73.2) |
| Record low °C (°F) | 12.1 (53.8) | 15.0 (59.0) | 18.0 (64.4) | 18.2 (64.8) | 18.9 (66.0) | 18.8 (65.8) | 18.8 (65.8) | 19.5 (67.1) | 17.4 (63.3) | 17.8 (64.0) | 14.5 (58.1) | 13.8 (56.8) | 12.1 (53.8) |
| Average precipitation mm (inches) | 2.0 (0.08) | 3.4 (0.13) | 15.8 (0.62) | 68.8 (2.71) | 122.1 (4.81) | 142.2 (5.60) | 191.7 (7.55) | 233.6 (9.20) | 181.6 (7.15) | 85.5 (3.37) | 3.5 (0.14) | 0.0 (0.0) | 1,050.2 (41.35) |
| Average precipitation days (≥ 1.0 mm) | 0.2 | 0.5 | 1.6 | 6.1 | 9.3 | 11.6 | 13.7 | 16.8 | 17.1 | 8.8 | 0.4 | 0.0 | 86.1 |
| Average relative humidity (%) | 27 | 28 | 40 | 58 | 69 | 78 | 83 | 85 | 84 | 77 | 54 | 35 | 59 |
| Mean monthly sunshine hours | 270.0 | 247.1 | 253.9 | 237.3 | 250.1 | 214.4 | 169.4 | 147.2 | 171.7 | 256.2 | 271.4 | 257.7 | 2,746.4 |
| Mean daily sunshine hours | 8.7 | 8.8 | 8.2 | 7.9 | 8.1 | 7.2 | 5.5 | 4.8 | 5.7 | 8.3 | 9.1 | 8.3 | 7.5 |
Source 1: NOAA (sun 1961–1990)
Source 2: Deutscher Wetterdienst (extremes 1941-1956, humidity 1951-1994, daily sun 1957-1986)
