= Kéran National Park =

National park in Togo

Oti-Kéran National Park
- Parc National de la Oti-Kéran
- IUCN category II (national park)
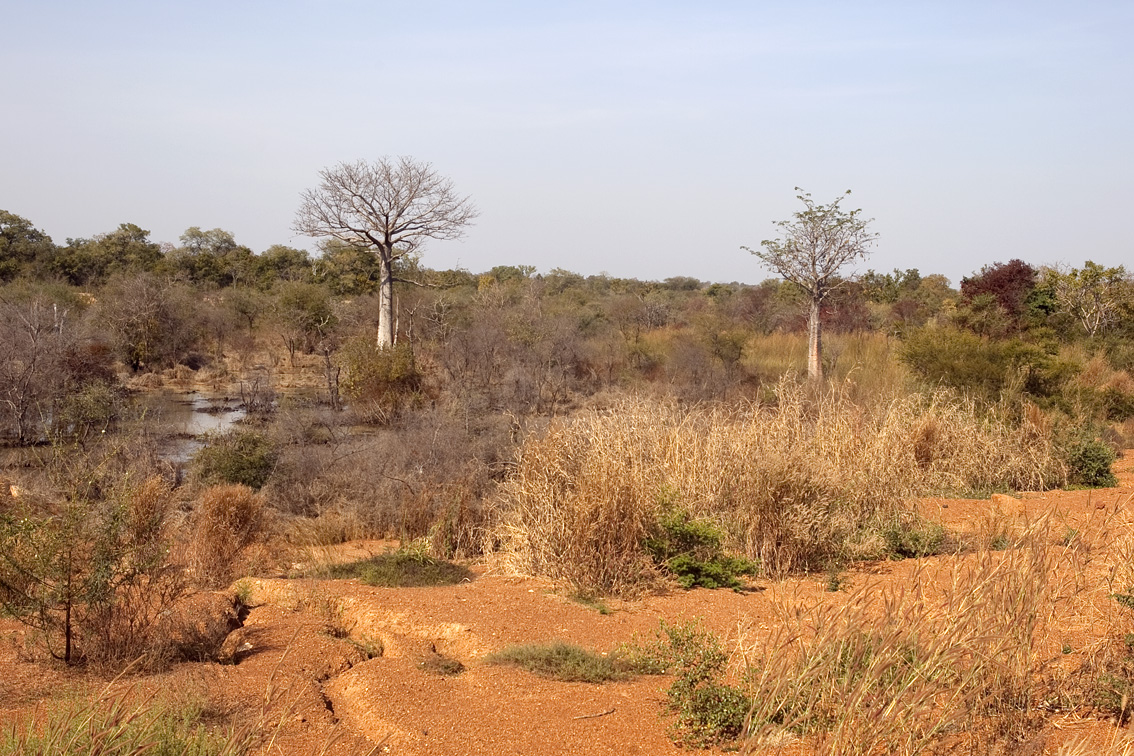

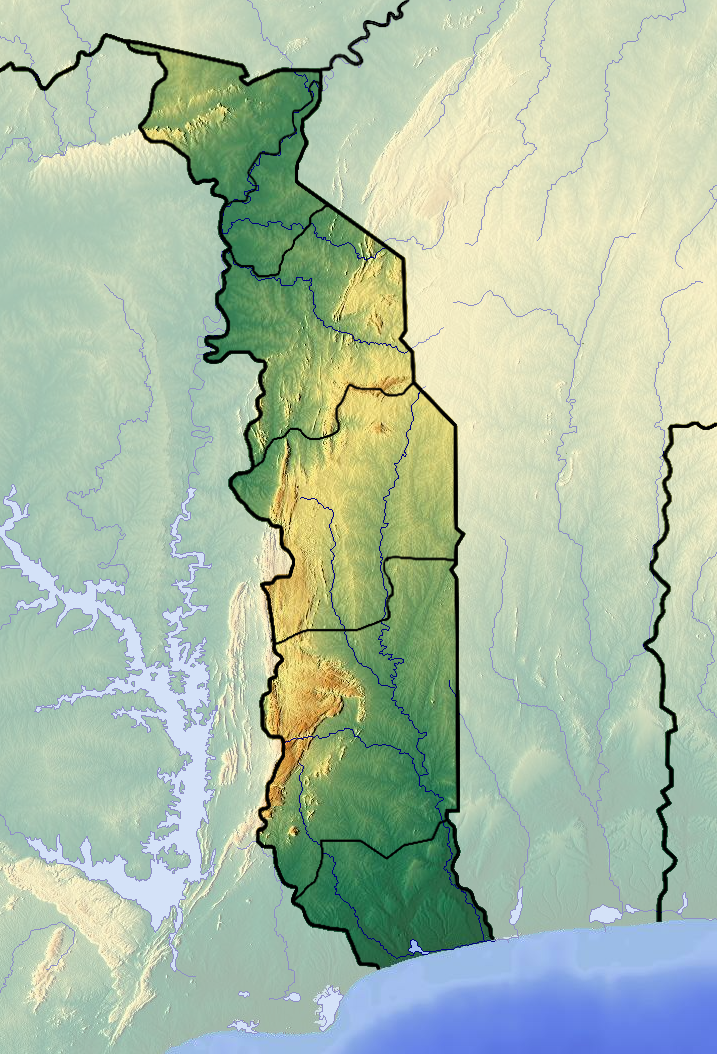
- Location within Togo
- Interactive map of Oti-Kéran National Park
- Location: Savannes Region, Togo
- Nearest city: Takpamba
- Coordinates: 10°12′00″N 0°37′41″E
- Area: 690 km^{2} (270 sq mi)
- Established: 1950

Ramsar Wetland
- Official name: Parc national de la Keran
- Designated: 4 July 1995
- Reference no.: 735

Oti-Kéran National Park is located in the north of Togo, in the Kara area. There is only one road going through this area. Not many tourists visit Togo as the main national parks are more accessible in Ghana.

== History ==
=== Social impact ===
The Oti-Kéran National Park belongs to a network of nature reserves in northern Togo that has been considerably expanded since the 1960s. These actions were undertaken without consent and participation of the local population. Instead of gaining income from tourism and other business opportunities potentially linked to the national parks, people were removed from their land and agricultural developments were abandoned, resulting in an increase of poverty and even hunger.

Additionally, wildlife - especially elephants - from the protected but not fenced areas caused damage to fields and crops in the surrounding communities. This led to antipathy by the local population against the protected areas and the wildlife. During political turmoil in 1990 this hatred broke free by massive attacks against the protected areas and mass-slaughtering of animals, resulting in major destruction of the environment.

=== Reorganisation since 1999 ===
As a result of widespread destruction and human invasion into the protected areas, Togolese authorities reformed the park boundaries since 1999. Peripheral areas deemed too much destroyed to be re-naturalized have been excluded from the national park and officially deallocated for human development. This shrunk the size of the national park, now named the Oti-Kéran National Park, from 179550 to 69000 hectares.

What remained is planned to form part of a future biosphere reserve, linked by the Oti-Mandouri National Park to the WAP (W, Arli, Pendjari) protected area system in Burkina Faso, Benin, and Niger. It is, however, still threatened by settlements, cotton-farming, charcoal production, and other human activities within the park boundaries.

=== Ecotourism ===
Ecotourism was quite well-developed in the Oti-Kéran National Park before 1990. A South African company invested in tourism infrastructure (hotel, road, observation platforms etc.), and ecotourism created monthly revenues for protected area management in the order of 50-60 million CFA (U$10000-1200000) in Oti-Kéran alone. At the time it was considered a regional model for protected area ecotourism development, and photographs still exist of herds of elephants and other key tourist attractions in the Park.

Today the entire infrastructure is ruined and the ecotourism sector has not really restarted in the area of Oti-Kéran after the long period of socio-political troubles. Very few regional tourists arrive from neighboring countries (WAP complex Niger, Burkina Faso, Benin), but there are no adequate facilities or accommodation in Togo to encourage them to stay longer. The national Ministry of Tourism is concentrating its efforts in the Plateau Region and considers it necessary for management of protected areas in the Oti-Keran / Oti-Mandouri Complex to be revitalized and for habitats and fauna to be re-established before ecotourism plans can be developed.

== Environment ==
=== Fauna ===
The destructions of the 1990s resulted in a reduced faunal diversity of the Togolese national parks compared to those in neighbouring Burkina Faso and Benin. An assessment in 2008 listed the following species though stating that their status is uncertain:

==== Mammals ====
- African elephant - A common sighting and attraction during the 1980s, elephants were probably nearly extirpated in the 1990s. An aerial survey in 2003 failed to find elephants in the park. Today, sporadic occurrences of migrating individuals and groups are reported. An UNDP project from 2010 aims to reestablish a population of about 20 animals in the park.
- Olive baboon
- Tantalus monkey
- Patas monkey - The presence of this species was confirmed by an aerial survey in 2003.
- Kob - The presence of this species was confirmed by an aerial survey in 2003.
- Waterbuck - The presence of this species was confirmed by an aerial survey in 2003.
- Red-flanked duiker
- Common duiker - The presence of this species was confirmed by an aerial survey in 2003.
- African buffalo
- Hippopotamus
- Warthog - The presence of this species was confirmed by an aerial survey in 2003.
- West African lion - Individuals of the lion has been reported sporadically, for the last time in 2005. There is no permanent lion population in Togo.
- Crested porcupine
- African striped ground squirrel
- Four-toed hedgehog

==== Birds ====
The park has been designated an Important Bird Area (IBA) by BirdLife International because it supports significant populations of many bird species. About 214 species of birds have been recorded, including:

- Black crowned crane
- Goliath heron
- Grey heron
- Pink-backed pelican
- Violet turaco
- Red-throated bee-eater
- Bearded barbet
- Pied-winged swallow
- Potasci Posoni
- Oriole warbler
- Blackcap babbler
- Purple starling
- Bronze-tailed starling
- White-crowned robin-chat
- White-fronted black chat
- Splendid sunbird
- Heuglin's masked weaver
- Red-winged pytilia
- Bar-breasted firefinch
- Black-faced firefinch
- Lavender waxbill
- Exclamatory paradise whydah
- Togo paradise whydah
- Brown-rumped bunting

==== Reptiles ====
- West African crocodile - formerly listed as Nile crocodile
