= Tandjouaré, Togo =

Tandjouaré
- Town
- Location in Togo
- Coordinates: 10°39′21″N 0°11′42″E
- Country: Togo
- Region: Savanes Region
- Prefecture: Tandjouaré

Tandjouaré is a small town in northern Togo. It is the capital of the Tandjouaré prefecture and lies approximately 20 kilometres from the regional capital of Dapaong. The town lies in a heavily protected area of Togo in the southern part of Fosse aux Lions National Park, with Foret de Barkosassi to the southeast. It contains a library and a secondary school.
