= Sansanné-Mango Airport =

Airport in Togo

- IATA: none; ICAO: DXMG

Summary
- Airport type: Public
- Serves: Mango
- Elevation AMSL: 460 ft / 140 m
- Coordinates: 10°22′20″N 0°28′15″E

Map

Runways
Direction	Length		Surface
Direction	ft	m	Surface
04/22	3,770	1,200	Unpaved
- Source: Google Maps

Sansanné-Mango Airport (ICAO: DXMG) is an airport serving Mango in Togo.

== See also ==
- Transport in Togo
