= Coastal Wetlands of Togo =

Protected wetlands in Togo

The Zones Humides du Littoral du Togo is an area near the coast in Togo designated as a Ramsar site, an area of international importance for wetland birds. The site was inscribed in 2007 and includes the whole of the coastal zone of the country, with a total area of 591,000 hectares (1,460,000 acres). It is located at 6°34'N and 1°25'E.

== Description ==
The site consists of mangrove forests, lagoons, lakes, marshes, creeks and pools, behind long sandy beaches. The dominant trees here are the red and black mangroves. The whole site houses a biodiverse community of birds, mammals, reptiles, fish, crustaceans and shellfish.

This coast is visited by four species of sea turtle, the green sea turtle, the leatherback sea turtle, the olive ridley sea turtle and the hawksbill sea turtle. The African manatee occurs in the sea, as well as in the brackish and fresh water habitats, and the hippopotamus inhabits the inland waterways.

The coastal region is of importance to the economy of Togo. Some 85% of the country's fish are caught off the coast here, and the sea is a transport link for people and goods. The forest is the source of timber for construction and firewood, bushmeat is hunted and natural products are gathered here for use as food and in herbal medicine.
