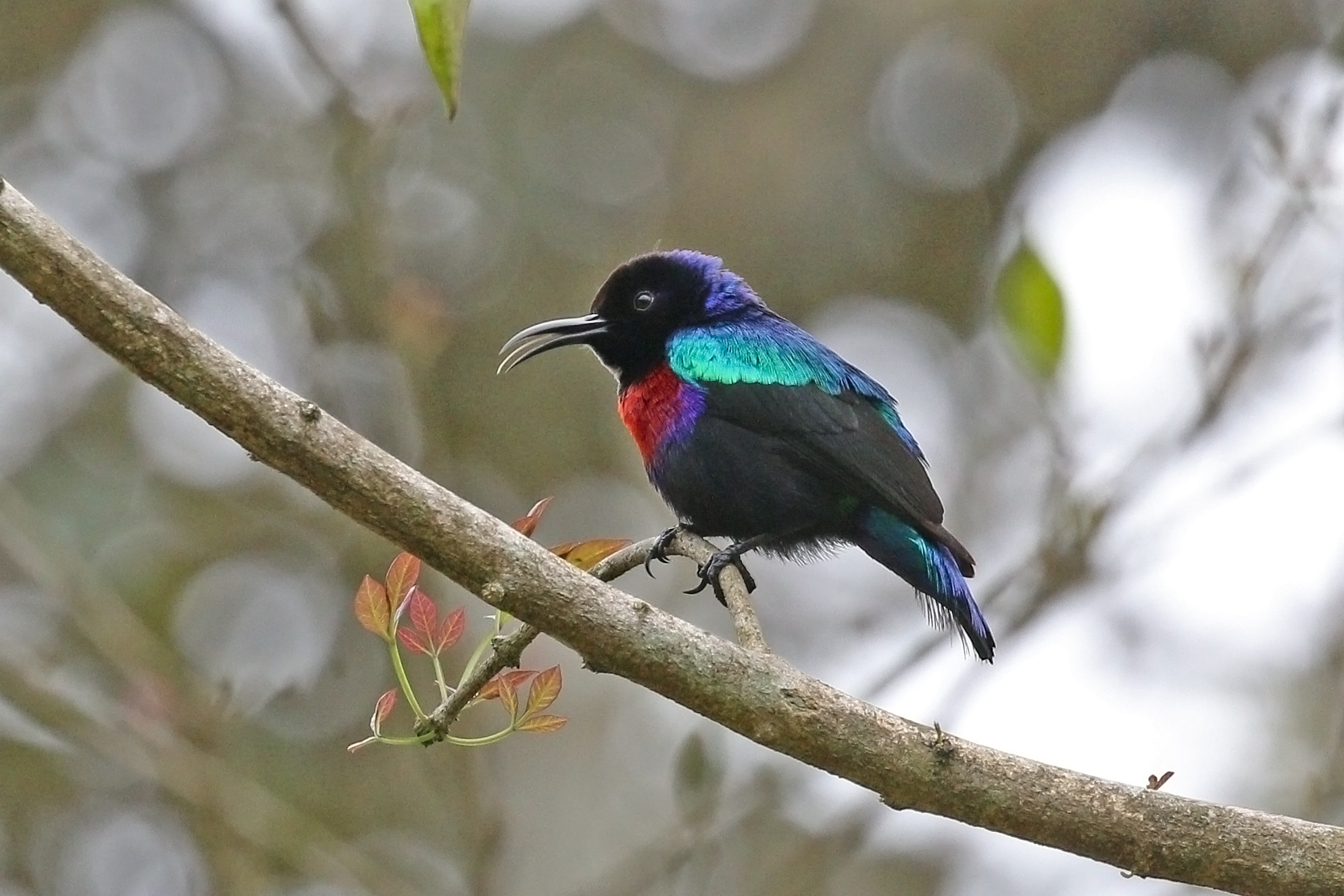
- Male in Aburi Botanical Gardens, Ghana

Conservation status
- Least Concern (IUCN 3.1)

Scientific classification
- Kingdom: Animalia
- Phylum: Chordata
- Class: Aves
- Order: Passeriformes
- Family: Nectariniidae
- Genus: Cinnyris
- Species: C. coccinigastrus

Binomial name
- Cinnyris coccinigastrus (Latham, 1801)

Synonyms
- Nectarinia coccinigaster Cinnyris coccinigaster

= Splendid sunbird =

Species of bird

The splendid sunbird (Cinnyris coccinigastrus) is a sunbird. The sunbirds are a group of very small Old World passerine birds which feed largely on nectar, although they will also feed on insects, especially when feeding young.

Their flight is fast and direct on short wings. Most species can take nectar by hovering like a hummingbird, but usually perch to feed most of the time.

The splendid sunbird breeds in west and central tropical Africa. One or two eggs are laid in an oval suspended nest in a tree. It is a seasonal migrant within its range.

Splendid sunbirds are 15 cm long, and have medium-long thin down-curved bills and brush-tipped tubular tongues, both adaptations to their nectar feeding. The adult male is mainly glossy purple, with a dark green back and wing bar, and a crimson breast patch. The female is greenish-brown above and yellowish below.

This species is a common breeder in wet savannah and woodland with oil palms, Elaeis guineensis. The latter provide sap from the incisions made in the trunk to collect the liquid to make palm wine.
