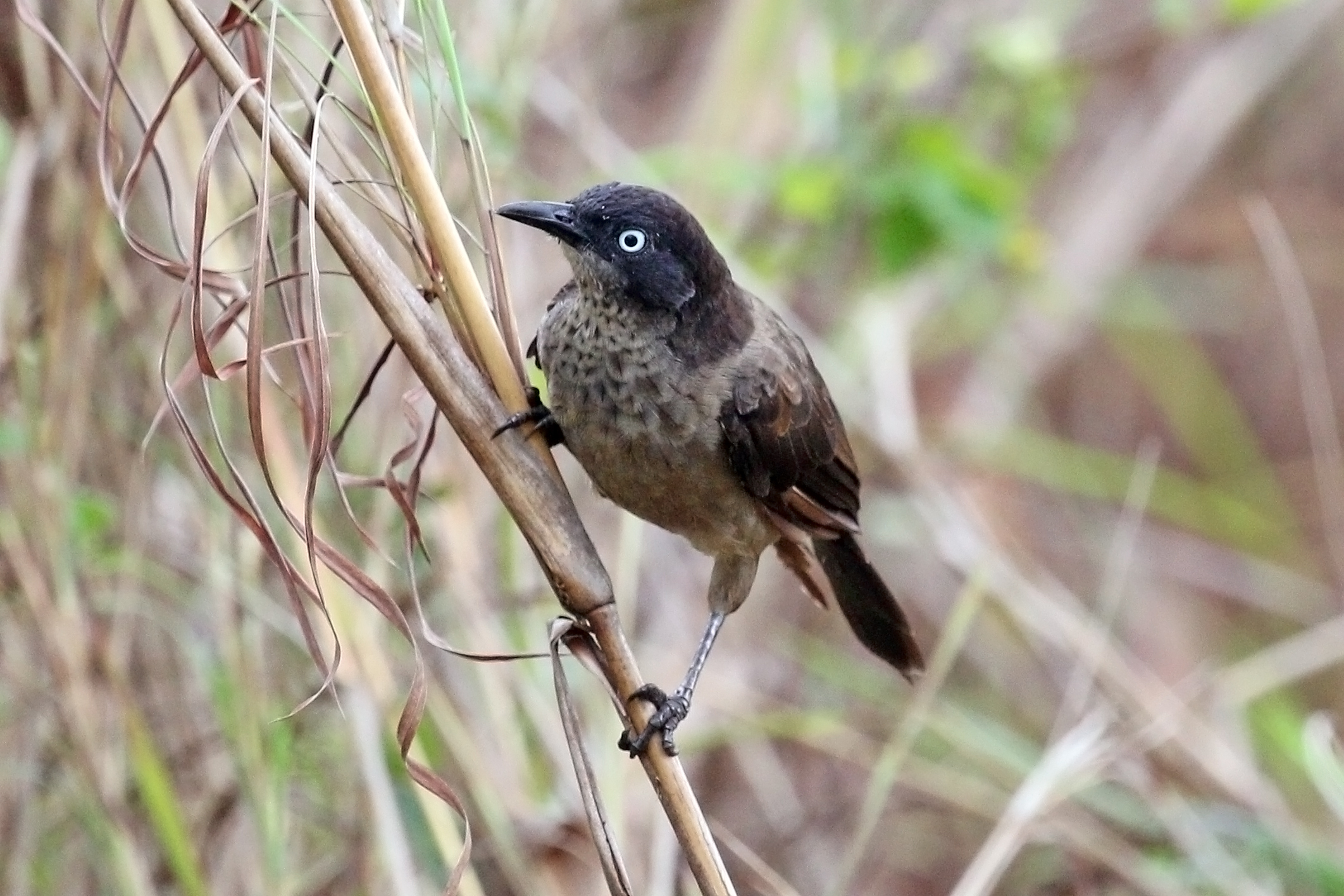
- T. r. stictilaema, Ghana

Conservation status
- Least Concern (IUCN 3.1)

Scientific classification
- Kingdom: Animalia
- Phylum: Chordata
- Class: Aves
- Order: Passeriformes
- Family: Leiothrichidae
- Genus: Turdoides
- Species: T. reinwardtii

Binomial name
- Turdoides reinwardtii (Swainson, 1831)

= Blackcap babbler =

Species of bird

The blackcap babbler (Turdoides reinwardtii) is a member of the family Leiothrichidae.

The blackcap babbler is a common resident breeding bird in west Africa from Senegal to Cameroon. Its habitat is thick scrub and forest. This species, like most babblers, is not migratory, and has short rounded wings and a weak flight.

It builds its cup-shaped nest in a tree, concealed in dense masses of foliage. The normal clutch is two or three eggs.

These birds have dark grey-brown upperparts. The head is brownish black with a white throat and conspicuous white eye ring. The underparts are white, mottled on the breast and with buff flanks.

The blackcap babbler lives in flocks of four to twelve or more, which help to raise the young communally. It is a noisy bird, and the presence of a flock may generally be known at some distance by the continual chattering, squeaking and chirping produced by its members. The main call is a cha-ka-ta. It feeds mainly on insects, but also eats fruit.

The binomial commemorates the botanist Caspar Georg Carl Reinwardt.
