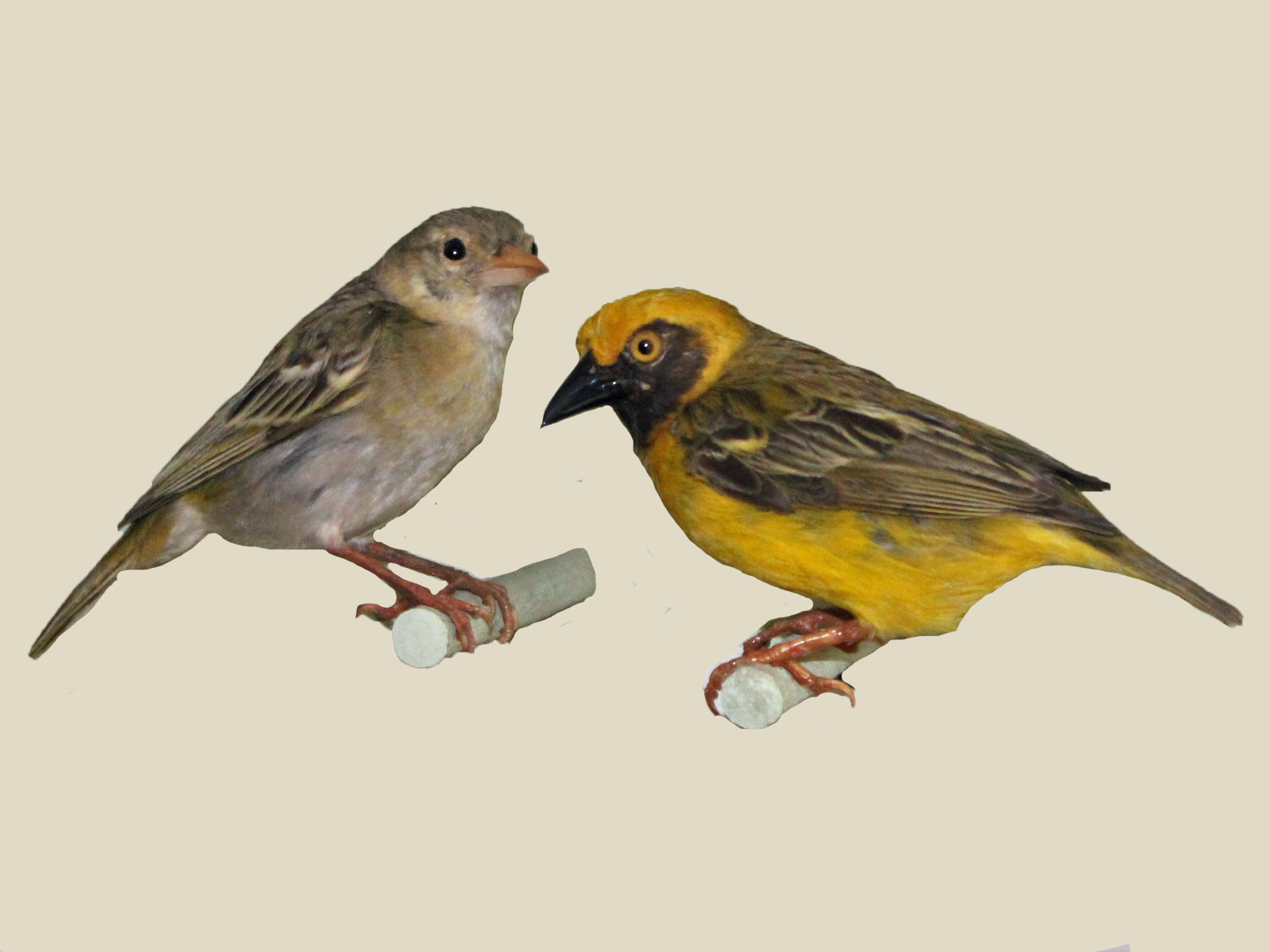
- Specimens at Nairobi National Museum
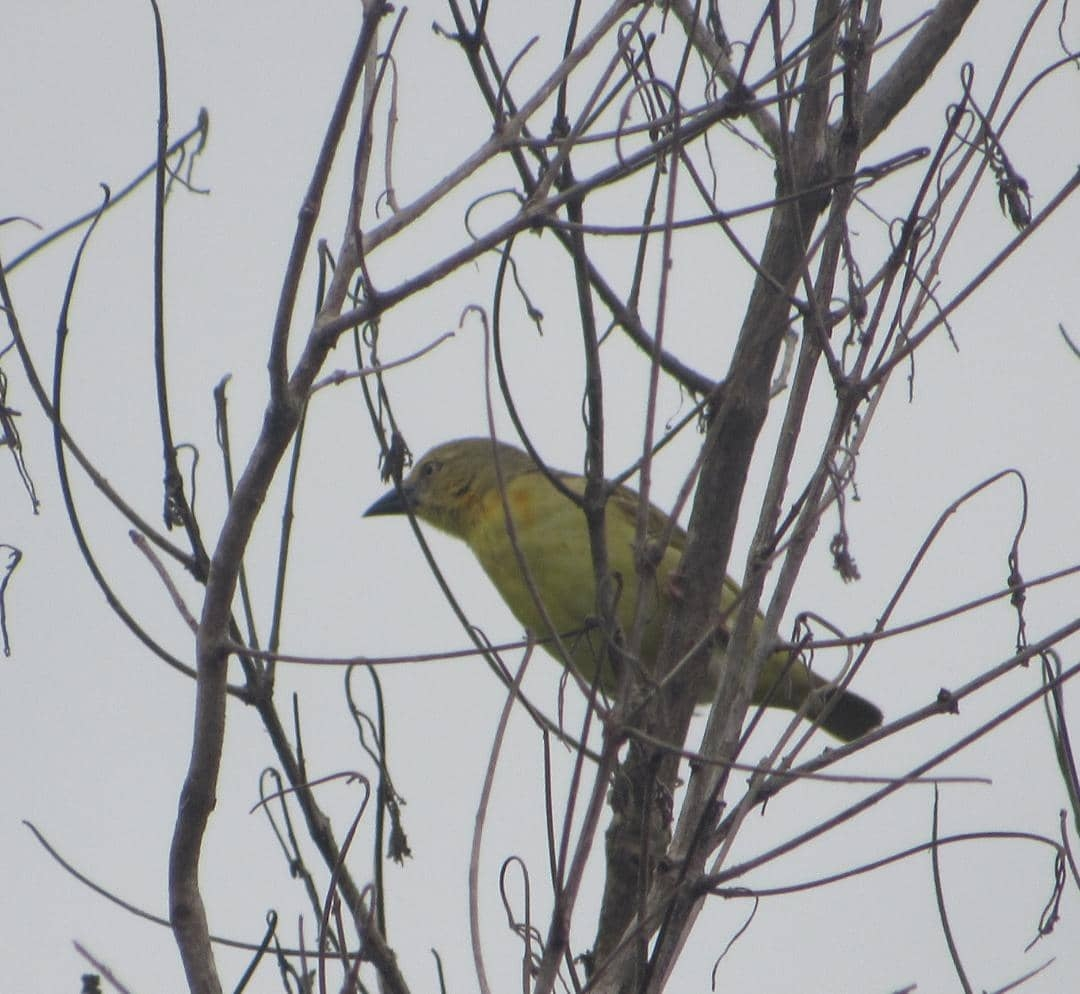
- Live bird in Nigeria

Conservation status
- Least Concern (IUCN 3.1)

Scientific classification
- Kingdom: Animalia
- Phylum: Chordata
- Class: Aves
- Order: Passeriformes
- Family: Ploceidae
- Genus: Ploceus
- Species: P. heuglini

Binomial name
- Ploceus heuglini Reichenow, 1886

= Heuglin's masked weaver =

Species of bird

Heuglin's masked weaver (Ploceus heuglini) is a species of bird in the weaver family, Ploceidae. It is found in Senegal, Gambia and Mali to Ivory Coast and east to Uganda and western Kenya.
