= Fosse aux Lions National Park =

National park in Togo

- Parc National Fosse aux Lions
- IUCN category II (national park)
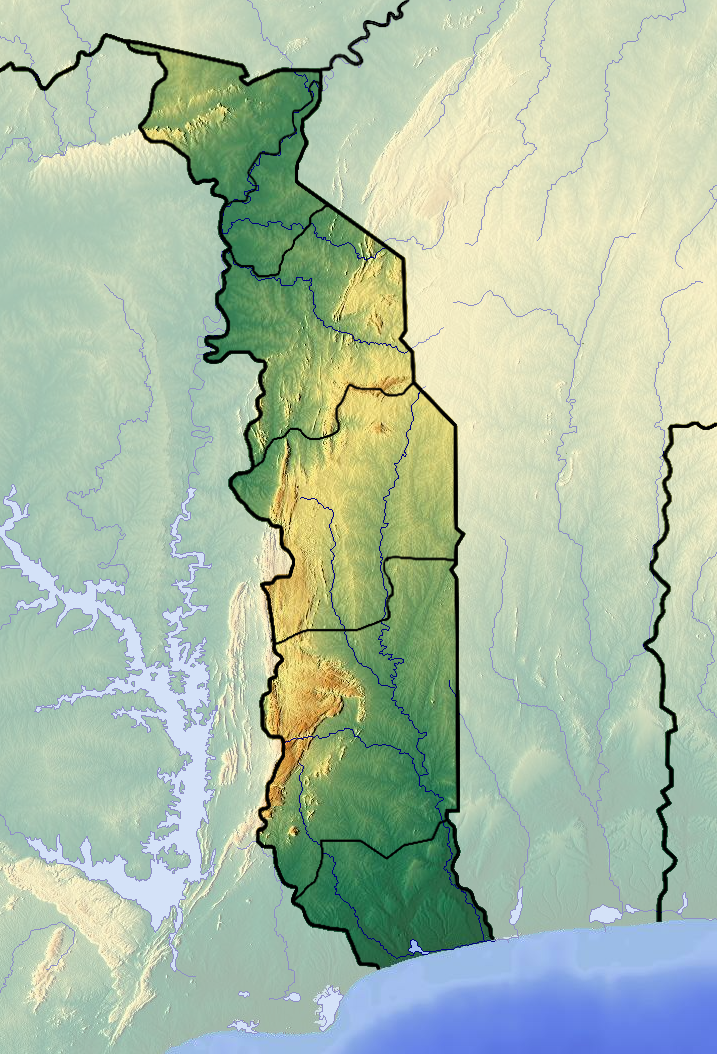
- Location within Togo
- Interactive map of Fosse aux Lions National Park
- Location: Savanes Region of Northern Togo
- Nearest city: Tandjouaré
- Coordinates: 10°45′N 0°10′E
- Area: 16.5 km^{2} (6.4 mi^{2})
- Established: 1954

Fosse aux Lions National Park (French: Parc National Fosse aux Lions) is a national park in the Savanes Region of Northern Togo. The park is approximately 16.5 square kilometres (6.4 sq mi) in size, and was first established as a reserved forest in 1954.

At one point, the park was home to a significant number of African elephants in the 1970s and 1980s, but their numbers have declined to nearly zero.

The small town of Tandjouaré, Togo lies within the park.
