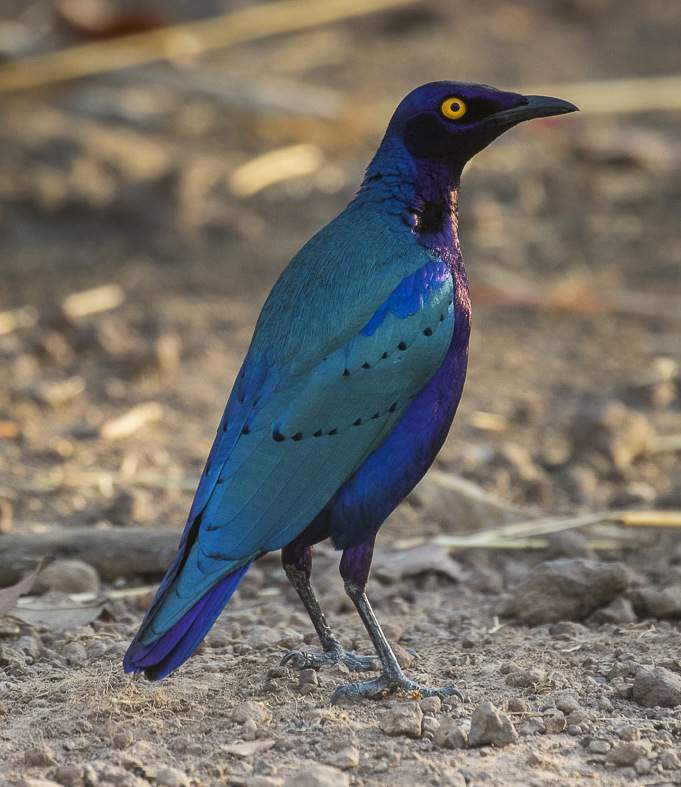
- Adult bird in The Gambia

Conservation status
- Least Concern (IUCN 3.1)

Scientific classification
- Kingdom: Animalia
- Phylum: Chordata
- Class: Aves
- Order: Passeriformes
- Family: Sturnidae
- Genus: Lamprotornis
- Species: L. purpureus

Binomial name
- Lamprotornis purpureus (Statius Muller, 1776)

= Purple starling =

Species of bird

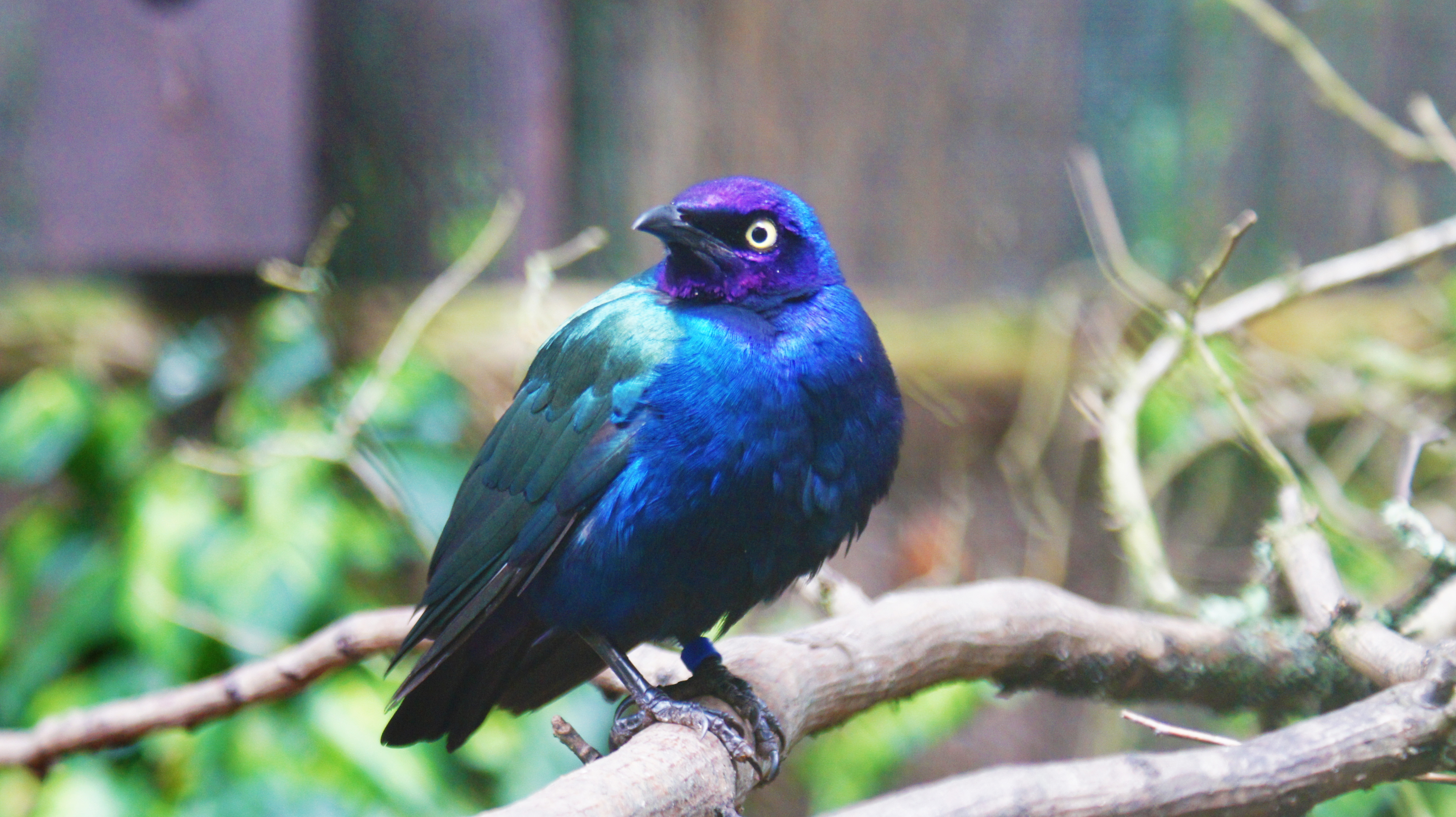
A purple starling at Birdworld, UK

The purple starling (Lamprotornis purpureus), also known as the purple glossy starling, is a member of the starling family of birds.

== Distribution and habitat ==
It is a resident breeder in tropical Africa from Senegal and north Zaire east to Sudan and west Kenya. This common passerine is typically found in open woodland and cultivation.

== Description ==
The adults of these stocky 22–23 cm long birds have a metallic purple head and body, and glossy green wings. They have a short tail and a yellow eye. The sexes are similar, but juveniles are much duller, with grey underparts and a brown iris.

== Behaviour ==
This is a gregarious and noisy bird, with typical starling squeaks and chattering.

=== Breeding ===
The purple starling builds a nest in a hole. The normal clutch is two eggs.

=== Feeding ===
Like most starlings, the purple starling is omnivorous, eating fruit and insects.
