= Oti River =

River in Togo

Oti River Rivière Oti
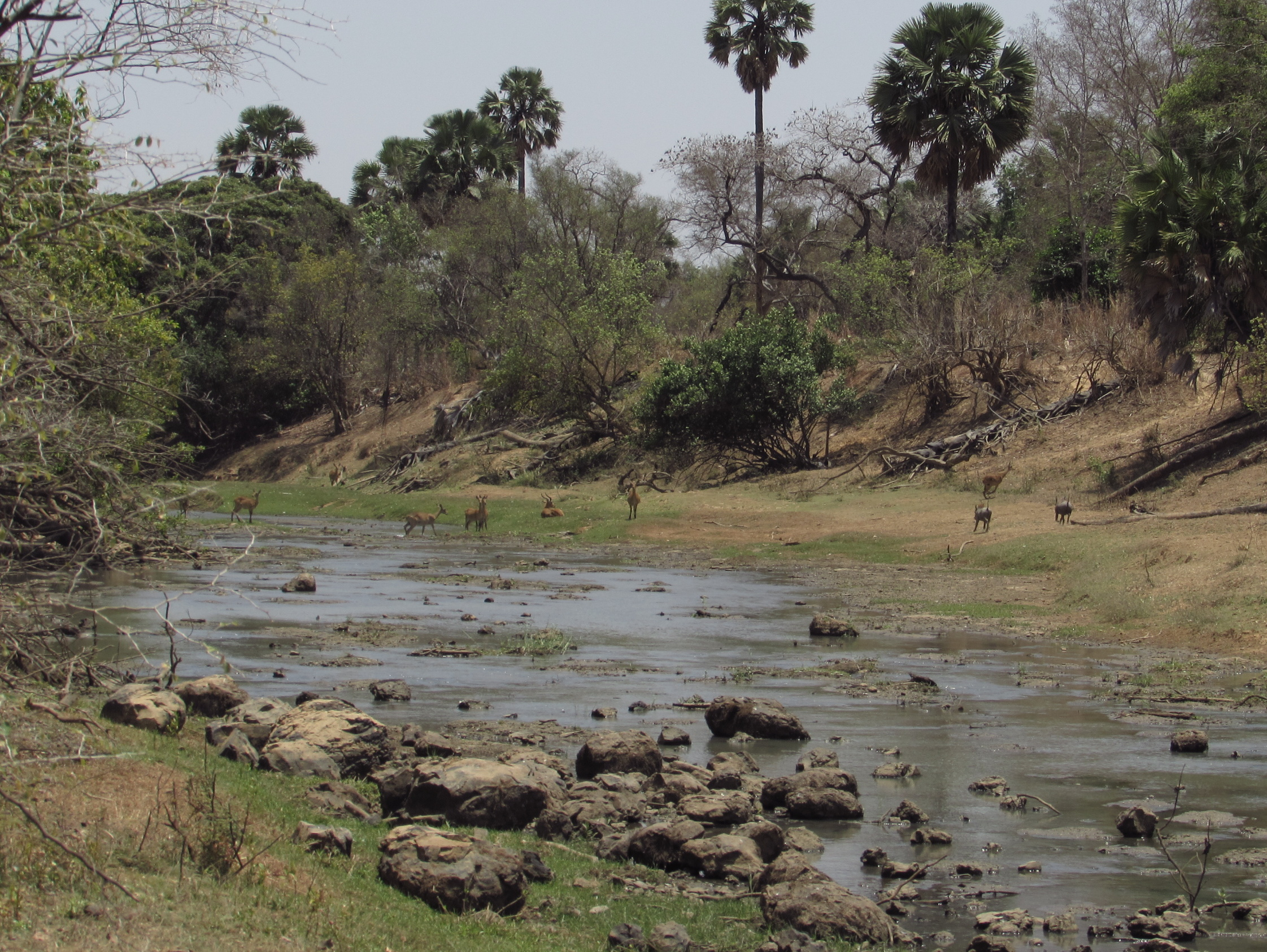
- Oti River in Pendjari National Park in dry season; Benin left, Burkina Faso right

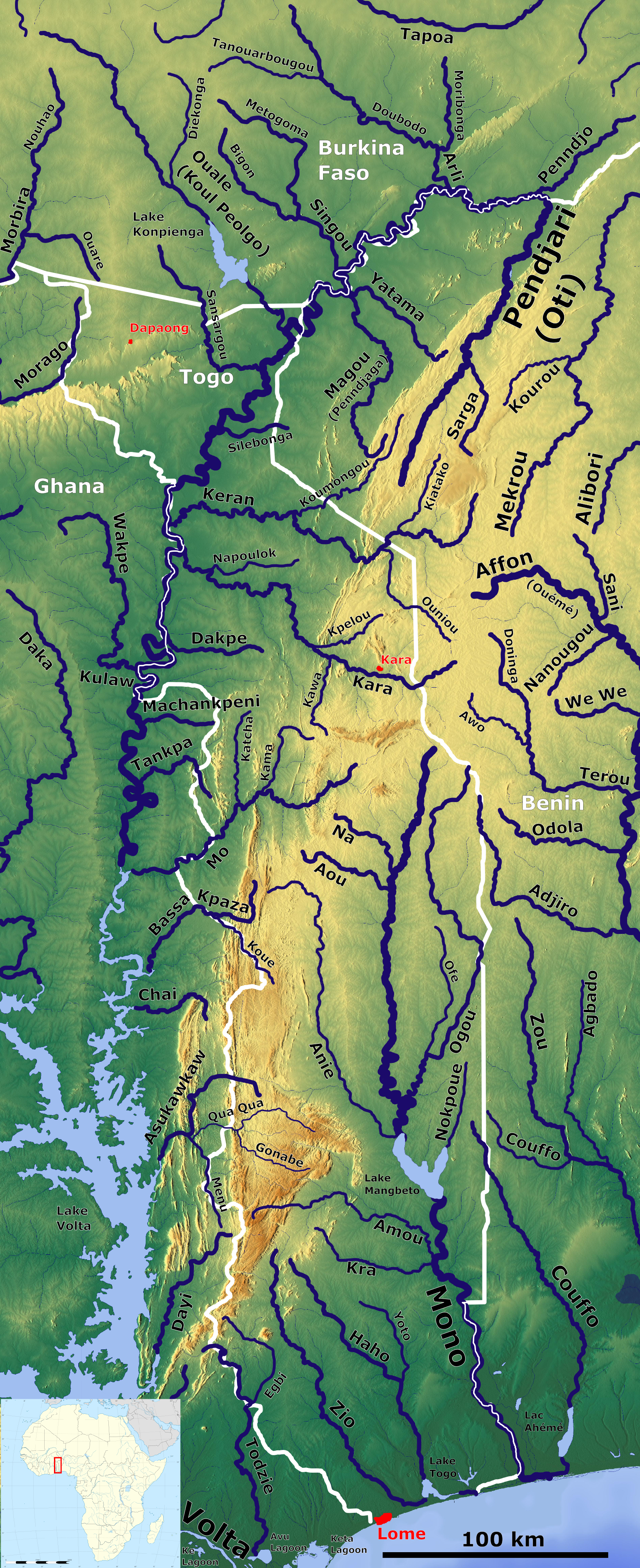
- Togo with the Oti River (north) and the Mono River (south)

Location
- Countries: Ghana; Burkina Faso; Togo; Benin

Physical characteristics
- Source
  - elevation: 150 m (490 ft)
- Mouth: Lake Volta of Ghana
  - location: Gulf of Guinea
  - coordinates: 8°46′48″N 2°34′29″W
- Length: 520 km (320 mi)
- Basin size: 72,000 km^{2} (28,000 sq mi)
- Discharge
  - location: Mouth

Basin features
- Designation

Ramsar Wetland
- Official name: Zone Humide de la Rivière Pendjari
- Designated: 2 February 2007
- Reference no.: 1669

The Oti River or Pendjari River (French: Rivière Pendjari) is an international river in West Africa. It rises in Benin, forms the border between Benin and Burkina Faso, flows through Togo, and joins the Volta River in Ghana.

== Geography ==
The Oti River is about 520 km (323 mi) long. Its headwaters are in Benin and Burkina Faso, it flows through Benin and Togo and joins the Volta River in Ghana. Tributaries on the left bank in Togo originate from the Togo Mountains to the south. One of its eastern tributaries is the Kara River, the confluence being on the Ghana–Togo border, where another tributary, the Koumongou River, joins from the south. The mouth of the Oti was formerly on the Volta River, but it now flows into Lake Volta reservoir in Ghana.

The river crosses the northern part of Togo in a savannah-clad valley some 40 or 50 km (25 or 31 mi) wide. Along the margins of the river is gallery forest which floods periodically. The dry season here lasts from about November until April, with the hot dry Harmattan wind blowing from the north. At this time of the year, the river's flow is minimal. Both the Oti and the Koumongou have floodplains, some 10 and 4 km (6.2 and 2.5 mi) wide, respectively. These flood extensively during the wet season, but during the dry season they become dry, dusty plains, with the occasional pond or lake in a depression. Cattle graze on the floodplains during the dry season. There is also some small-scale growing of crops, and the hunting of game takes place there.

=== International borders ===
The river forms part of the international borders between Ghana, Burkina Faso, Togo, and Benin.

=== Parks ===
The Oti River flows through Pendjari National Park in Benin and the Oti-Kéran National Park in Togo.

== Length and Basin Characteristics ==
The Oti River has an approximate length of about 520 km.

The basin experiences strong seasonal variability, with most tributaries showing reduced flow or dry channels during the dry season.

== Hydrology and Seasonal Flow ==
The river is highly seasonal, with peak discharge occurring during the rainy season and very low flow during the dry Harmattan period.

This seasonal variability causes periodic flooding of surrounding floodplains, especially in Togo and northern Ghana.

== Ecology and Environment ==
The Oti River basin includes savannah ecosystems, floodplains, and gallery forests that support seasonal agriculture and pastoralism.

Floodplains along the river are used for grazing and cultivation during dry periods when water levels recede.

== Economic and Human Importance ==
The river is a key water resource for agriculture, livestock, and local fishing communities across Burkina Faso, Togo, and Ghana.

It also contributes to irrigation potential and rural livelihoods in the Volta Basin, which is one of the most important hydrological systems in West Africa.
