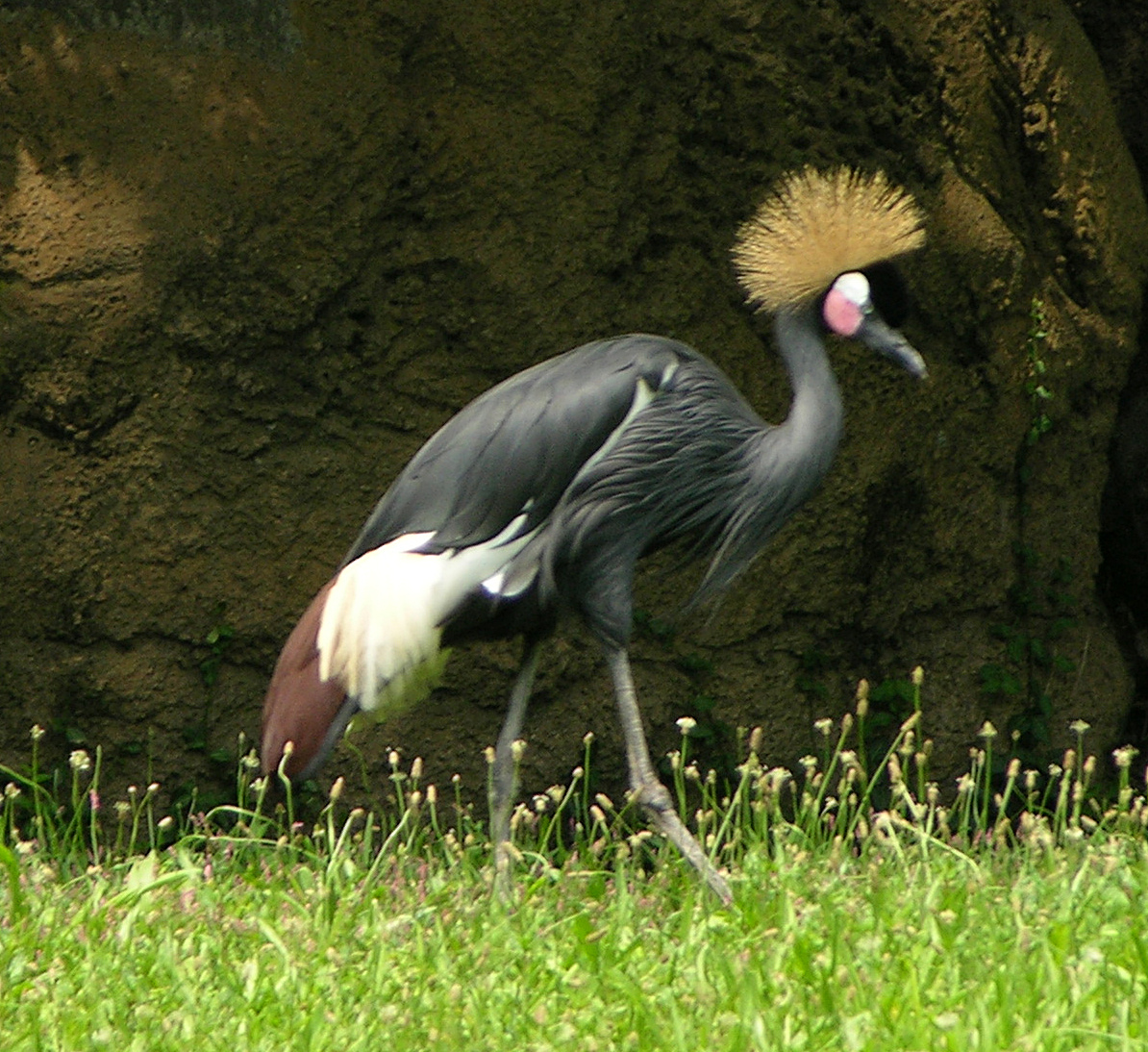
- A black crowned crane at Philadelphia Zoo, Pennsylvania

Conservation status
- Vulnerable (IUCN 3.1)
- CITES Appendix I

Scientific classification
- Kingdom: Animalia
- Phylum: Chordata
- Class: Aves
- Order: Gruiformes
- Family: Gruidae
- Genus: Balearica
- Species: B. pavonina

Binomial name
- Balearica pavonina (Linnaeus, 1758)
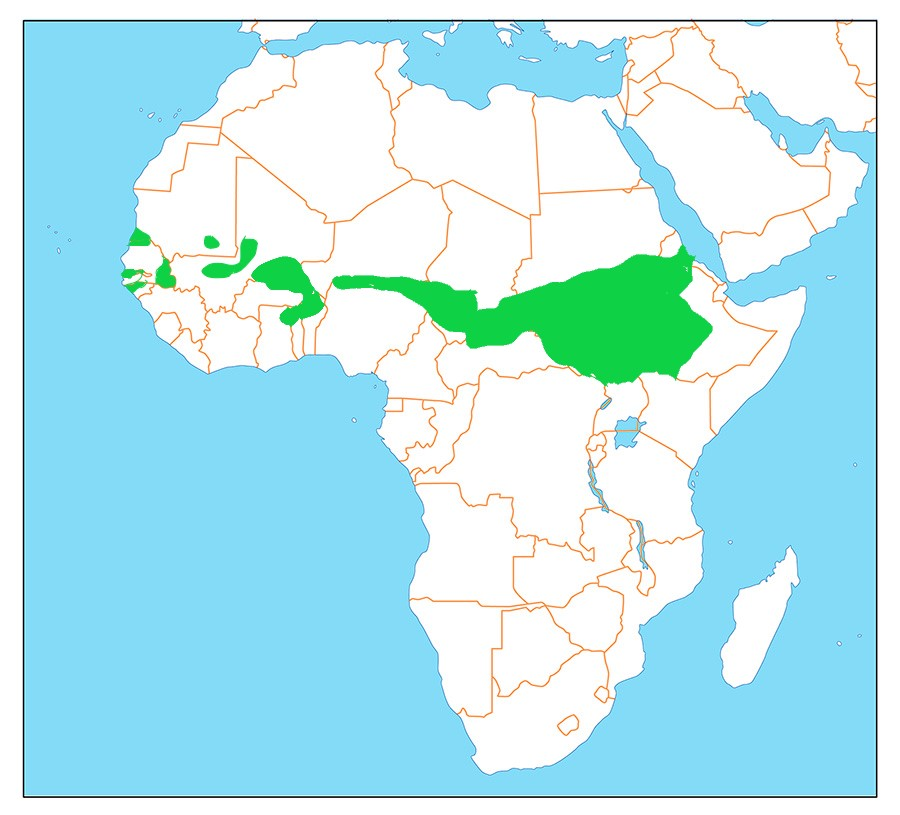

Synonyms
- Ardea pavonina Linnaeus, 1758

= Black crowned crane =

Species of bird

The black crowned crane (Balearica pavonina) is a part of the family Gruidae, along with its sister species, the grey crowned crane. It is topped with its characteristic bristle-feathered golden crown. It is usually found in the shallow wetlands of sub-Saharan Africa during the wet season, which act as its principal breeding, feeding and roosting sites although it can also be found foraging in grasslands and near croplands of dry savanna.

== Taxonomy ==
The black crowned crane was formally described in 1758 by the Swedish naturalist Carl Linnaeus in the tenth edition of his Systema Naturae. He placed it with the cranes and herons in the genus Ardea and coined the binomial name Ardea pavonina. He specified the type locality as simply "Africa". Linnaeus cited earlier authors including the English naturalist George Edwards who in 1751 had included a description and a hand-colour etching of the "Crowned African Crane" in the fourth volume of his A Natural History of Uncommon Birds. The black crowned crane is now placed together with the grey crowned crane in the genus Balearica that was introduced in 1760 by the French zoologist Mathurin Jacques Brisson. The genus name is from Latin Baliaricus meaning "of the Balearic Islands". The specific epithet pavonina is Latin meaning "peacock-like" or "patterned or coloured like the peacock's tail".

Two subspecies are recognised:

- Balearica pavonina ceciliae Mitchell, PC, 1904 – southwest Chad to west Ethiopia to northwest Kenya and north Uganda
- Balearica pavonina pavonina (Linnaeus, 1758) – Senegal and Gambia to Chad

== Description ==
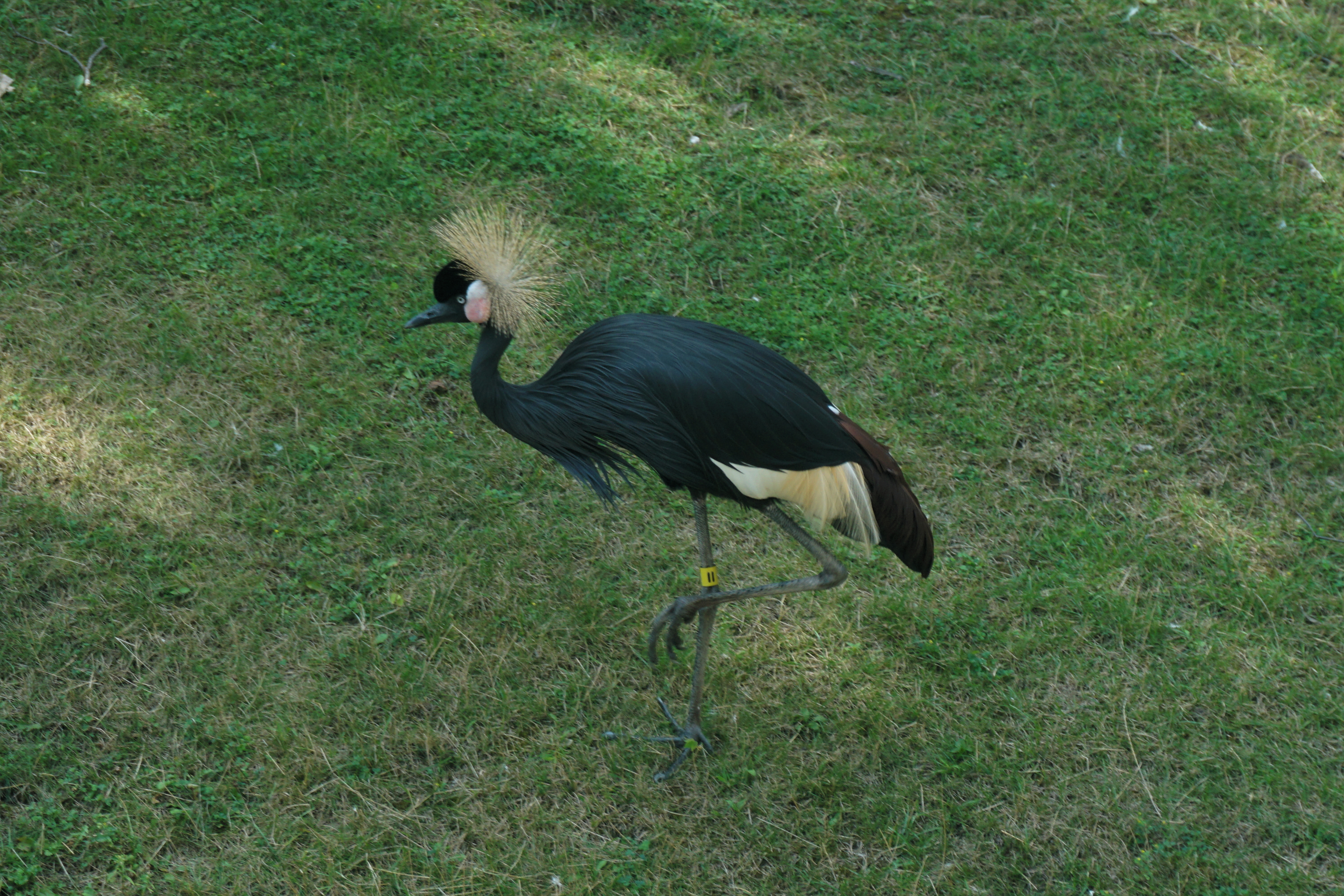
The black crowned crane at the Milwaukee County Zoo in Milwaukee, Wisconsin

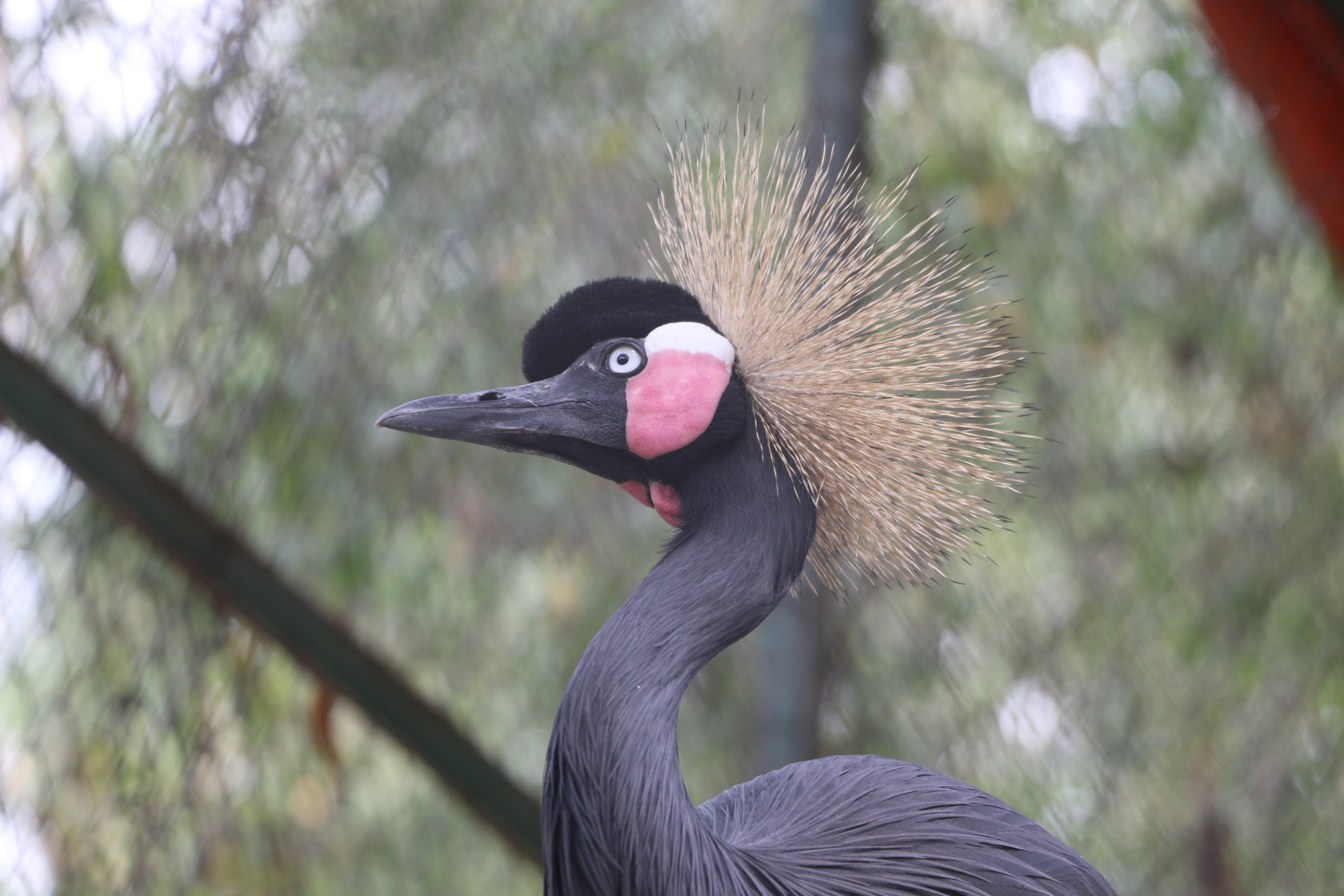
The black crowned crane at the Gazipur Safari Park, near Dhaka

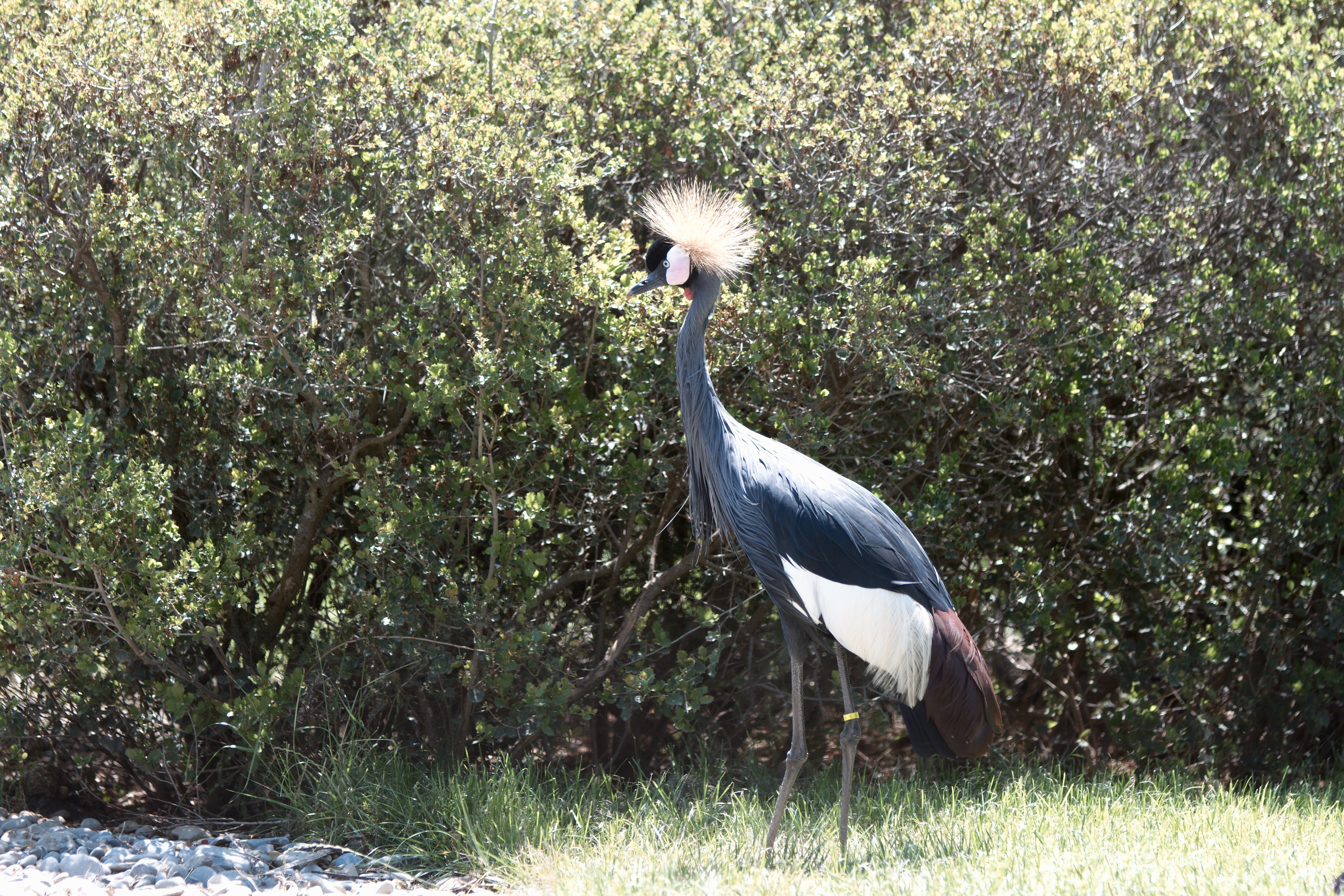
Side profile of Balearica pavonina at La Barben's zoo (France)

The black crowned crane can measure up to 105 cm (41 in) in length, weigh between 3,000–4,000 g (110–140 oz) and has a wingspan of 180–200 cm (71–79 in). Naturally, it is characterized by its dark slate-grey to black plumage, and it has stiff golden feathers at the top of its head which make up its crown. Each golden bristle-like feather is a spiral that is white on one side and brown on the other with black at the very tip.

Other distinct features of these birds include the white feathers on the upper section of their wings and the small pouch of red skin, the gular sac, hanging underneath their chins. Their long legs and their toes are black, and they possess a long hind toe that allows them to grasp onto perches. The black crowned crane also has large red cheek patches just behind its eye that differ in size between its two subspecies; the West African black crowned crane (Balearica pavonina pavonina) has red on the lower half of its cheek patch while the Sudan black crowned crane (Balearica pavonine ceciliae) has red extending to the upper half as well. Male black crowned cranes are larger but are otherwise indistinguishable from females. Juveniles are mostly grey with a brown crown and a nape, grey to brown body.

== Habitat and distribution ==
The black crowned crane is found across the Sahel and Sudan savanna regions of Africa, occupying open areas such as grasslands, shallow wetlands, marshes, as well as the margins of lakes and rivers. It is also known to roost in trees. Its range extends from the Senegal Basin and Guinea-Bissau Drainage in West Africa to the Ethiopian Highlands and South-West Rift Valley in East Africa. Balearica pavonina pavonina occupies the western part of this range, while Balearica pavonina ceciliae is found in the east with the greatest numbers in Sudan.

== Behavior ==
Black crowned crane at Disney's Animal Kingdom

=== Vocalization ===
Black crowned crane vocalization is characterized as generally low-pitched and mellow "honk" and "ka-wonk ka-wonk ka-wonk" expressions.

=== Diet ===
Black crowned cranes are generalist feeders, with a diet consisting of insects like grasshoppers, locust, and flies; other invertebrates, like molluscs, millipedes, and crustaceans; fish, amphibians, and small reptiles. They will be mostly resident to wetlands except during the dry season and will sometimes forage in short and dry grasses or in upland areas by livestock where insect numbers are high. Black crowned cranes may also forage in croplands and feed on rice, corn, teff, millet, chickpea, and lentil. They will seldom dig for food but rather will peck at it off surfaces. As an alternative to digging, they might stomp their feet to disturb and reveal invertebrates in the soil.

=== Breeding ===
Breeding may occur from May to December for the West African black crowned crane and from July to January for the Sudan black crowned crane. The margins for breeding time are wide as breeding success is dependent on the wet and dry seasons and the suitability of the environment. Black crowned crane numbers will peak in the dry season where flocks may include several hundred individuals. They gather in this way before the next breeding season commences, which allows for juvenile cranes to merge with other young flocks that have not yet reached the first breeding age of 3–5 years. In the breeding season, Black crowned cranes are usually found in pairs but are also observed in groups of up to 20 individuals.

Nests (base of 69–109 mm x 71–140 mm diameters) are built within or on the edges of dense wetlands and are constructed with grasses and sedges modified into circular platforms. Due to their opportunistic nature regarding food availability and shelter, Black crowned cranes may alter their nesting sites accordingly with the season. Clutch sizes for the black crowned crane are made up of 1 to 3 eggs, which will be 122–168 g (4.3–5.9 oz) in mass. Incubation of eggs will be performed by both males and females and will last 28–31 days. Males are known to stand guard by the nest in nearby trees, prepared to signal a threat, as females forage. Chicks will forage with their parents in grassland areas the day after hatching. Fledging takes place between 60–100 days.

== Conservation status and threats ==
As of 2024, the black crowned crane is listed as a Vulnerable species on the IUCN Red List, with an estimated population of 44,000–77,000 mature individuals. Black crowned cranes face major conservation threats due to the degradation of wetlands which act as the principal breeding, feeding and roosting sites for the species. Increases in drought and the draining of wetlands in the name of farming, dam construction or irrigation projects have led to the destruction of these ecosystems. Furthermore, fragmented wetlands result in reduced movement of aquatic mammals and therefore limits Black crowned crane food availability. The negative effects of habitat degradation on black crowned crane populations are further aggravated by the hunting, capturing or trade of these birds which have claimed much of their remaining wild populations.

== In culture ==
The black crowned crane is the national bird of Nigeria, and is often regarded as a symbol of peace.

== Gallery ==
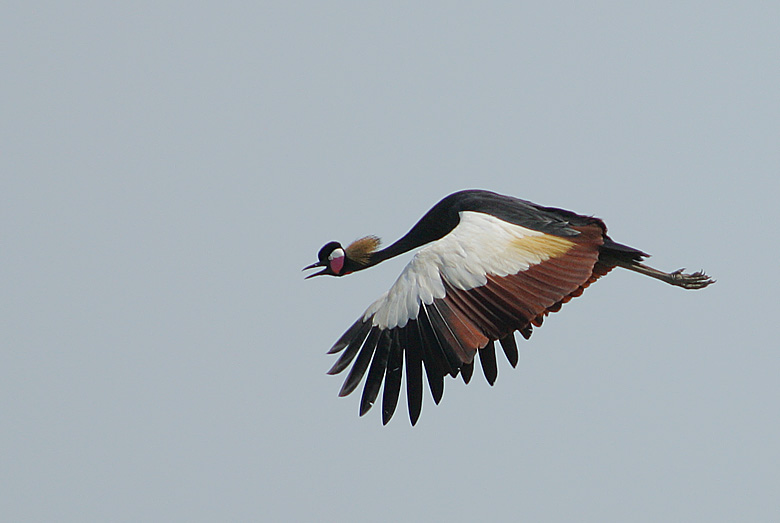
In flight

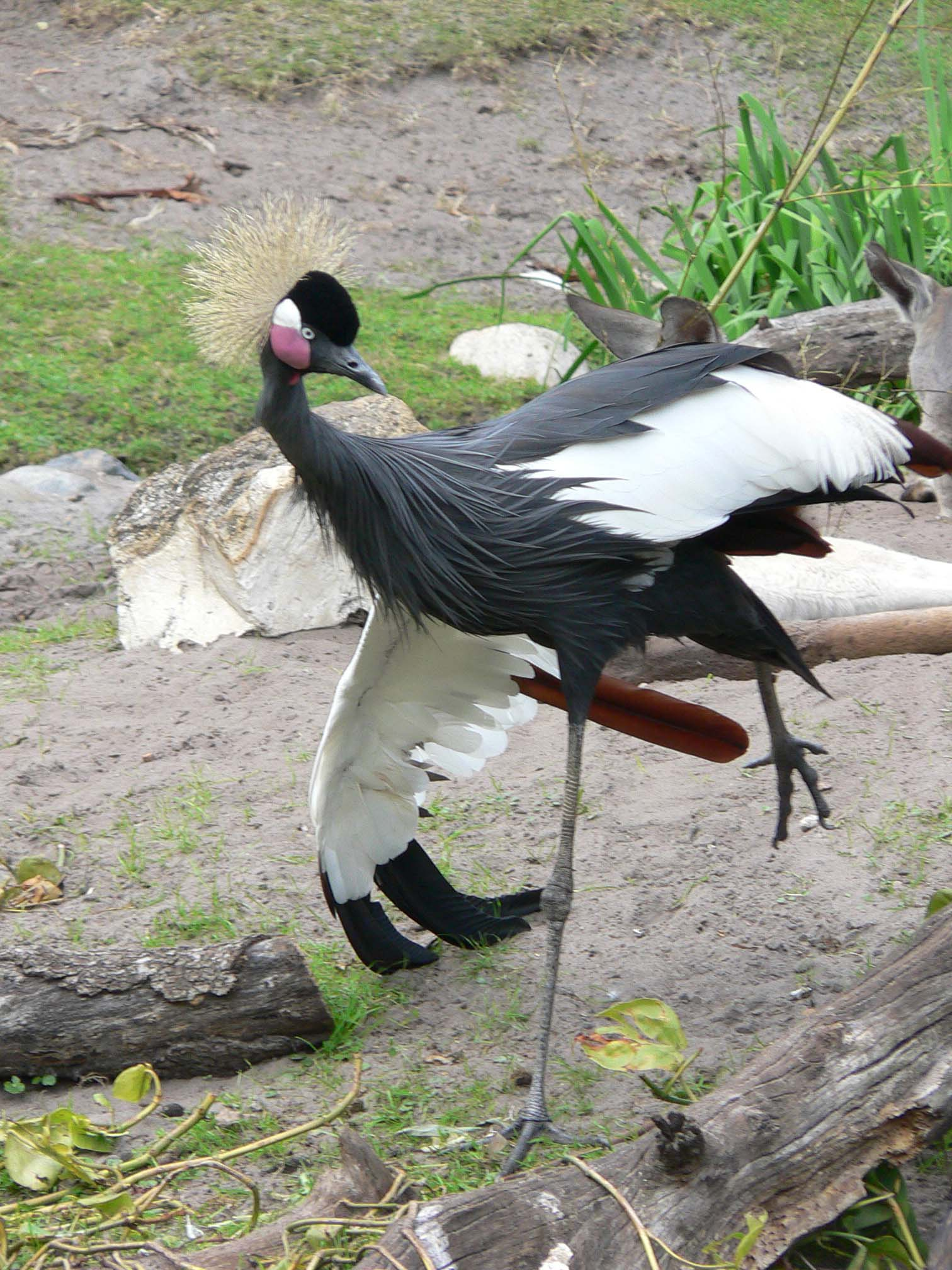

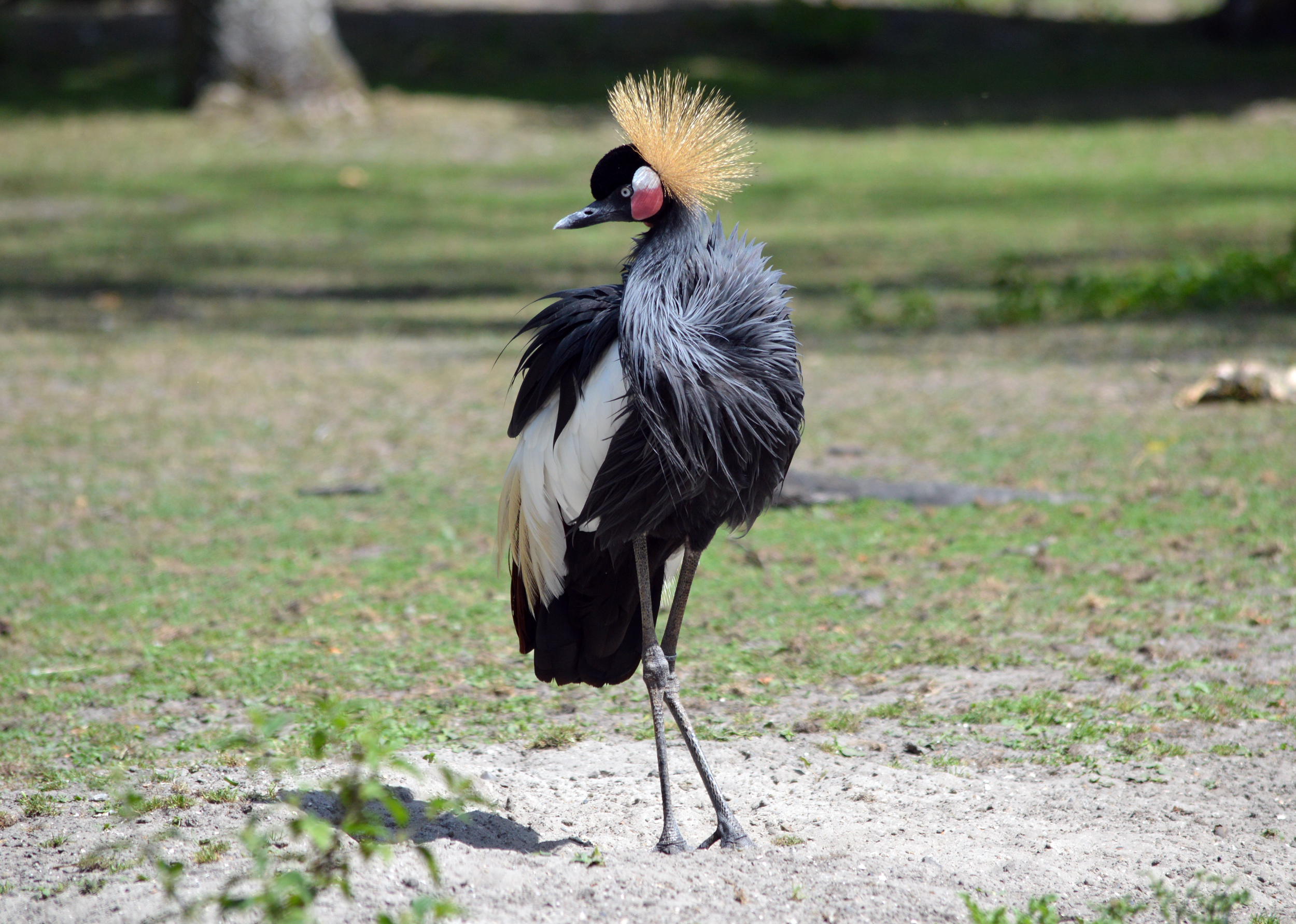
Balearica pavonina in Zoo d'Amiens

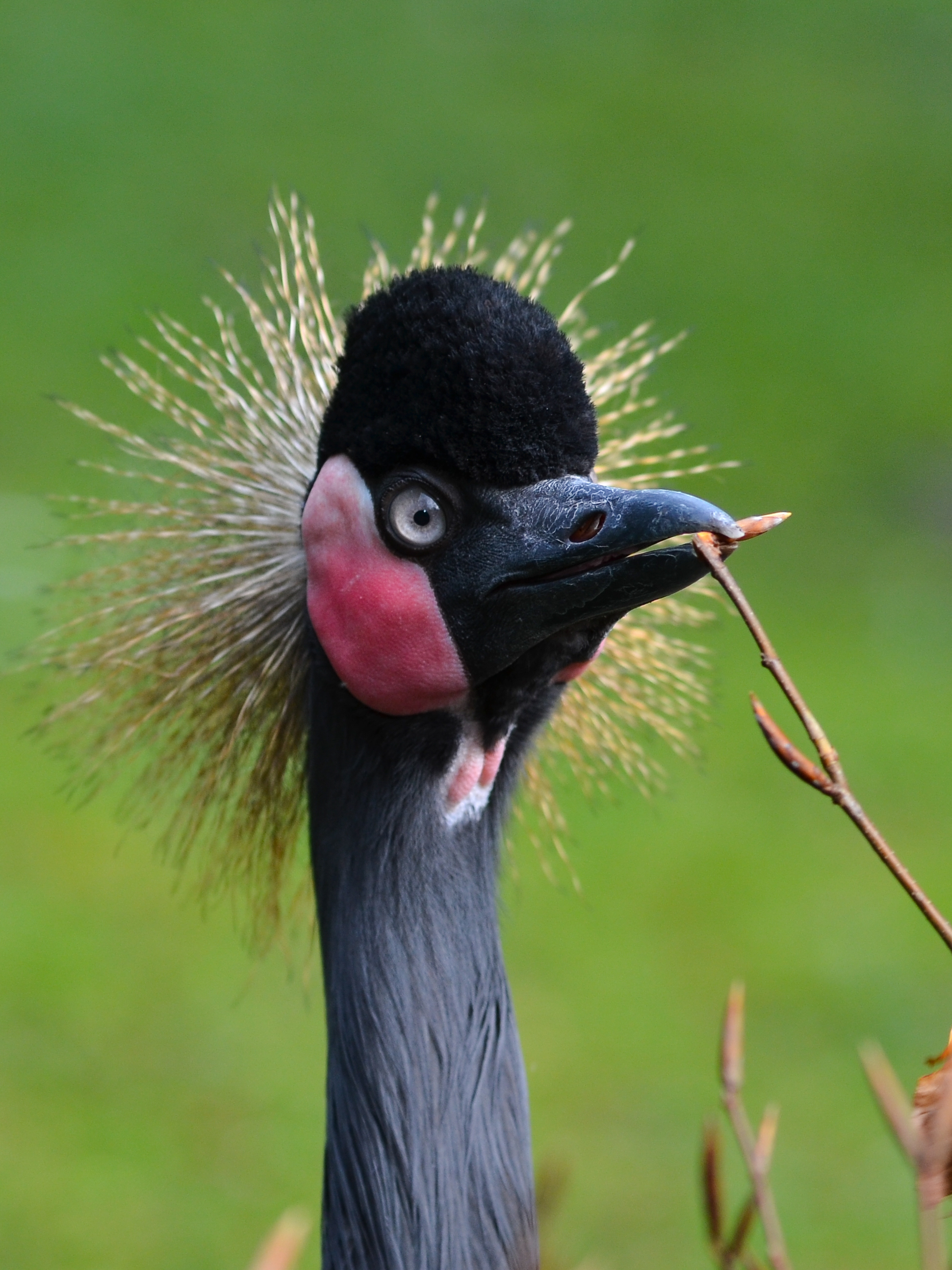
Eating
