= Cream-bellied munia =

Scientific classification
- Domain: Eukaryota
- Kingdom: Animalia
- Phylum: Chordata
- Class: Aves
- Order: Passeriformes
- Family: Estrildidae
- Genus: Lonchura
- Species: L. ferruginosa × L. quinticolor

Synonyms
- Lonchura pallidiventer (Restall, 1996)

Species of bird

The cream-bellied munia or cream-bellied mannikin (Lonchura pallidiventer) is a bird of the family Estrildidae. It was described as new to science by Restall (1996) but is considered a hybrid by van Balen (1998) and Dickinson (2003) and this treatment is followed by the BirdLife Taxonomic Working Group and it is not recognised by BirdLife International or the IOC. It is found only in Borneo.
