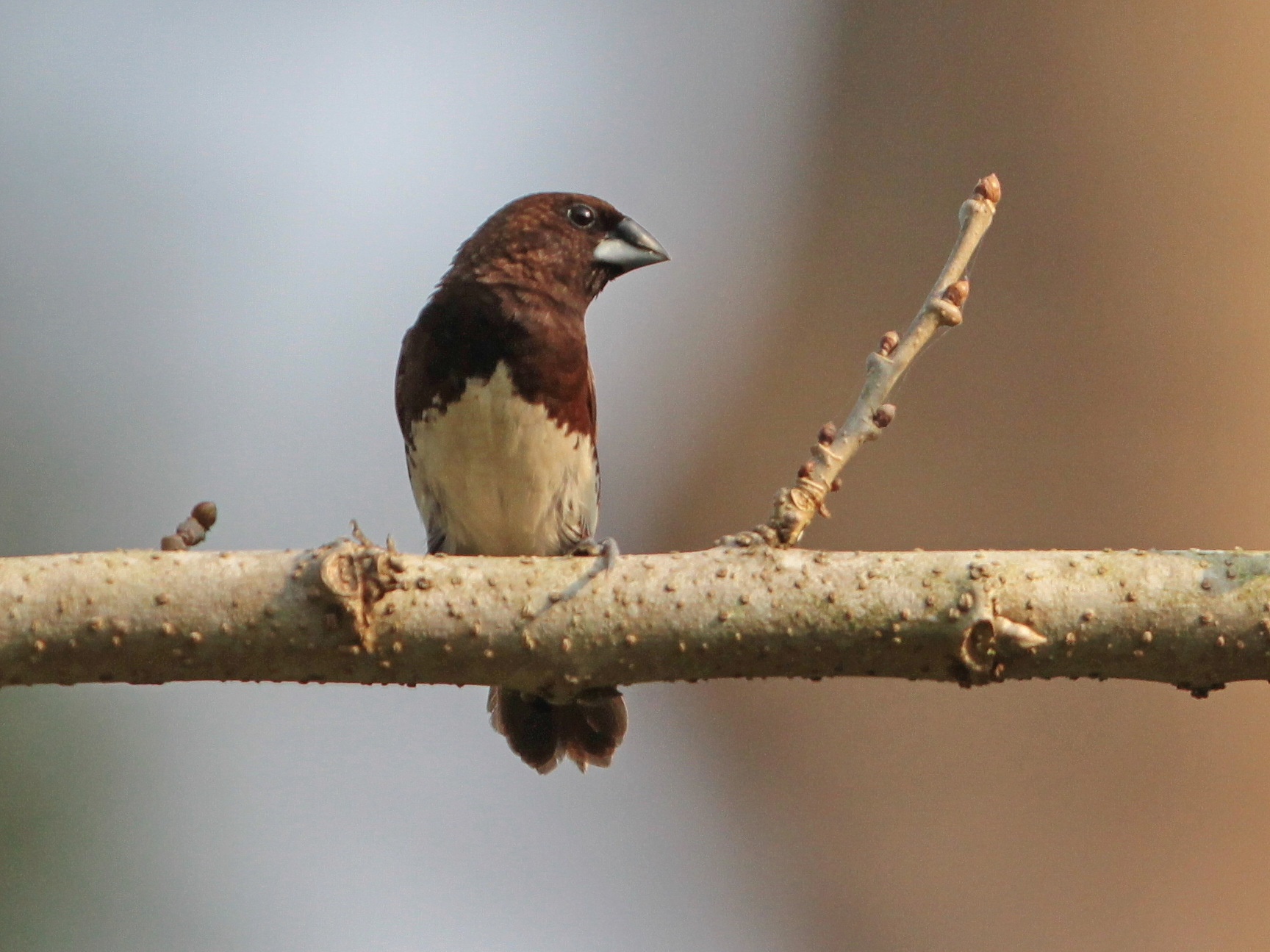

Conservation status
- Least Concern (IUCN 3.1)

Scientific classification
- Kingdom: Animalia
- Phylum: Chordata
- Class: Aves
- Order: Passeriformes
- Family: Estrildidae
- Genus: Lonchura
- Species: L. leucogastra

Binomial name
- Lonchura leucogastra (Blyth, 1846)

= White-bellied munia =

Species of bird

The white-bellied munia (Lonchura leucogastra) is a species of estrildid finch. It is found in Malesia. Its natural habitat is subtropical/ tropical lowland moist forest habitat, and it is also found in grasslands and residential areas. The status of the species is evaluated as Least Concern. It is an invasive species.

== Diet ==
It is a granivore, consuming 2-2.8 grams of rice per day. It sometimes forages in mixed-species flocks with white-headed munias and Javan munias.
