= Ricebird =

Ricebird is a name for a number of different birds, especially those that feed on paddy fields or on various grains (not necessarily just rice). Most commonly, it refers to the:

- Bobolink (Dolichonyx oryzivorus)
- Java sparrow (Lonchura oryzivora)
- Mannikins (Lonchura), a genus
- Yellow-breasted bunting (Emberiza aureola)
- Village weaver (Ploceus cucullatus), in English-speaking West African countries
