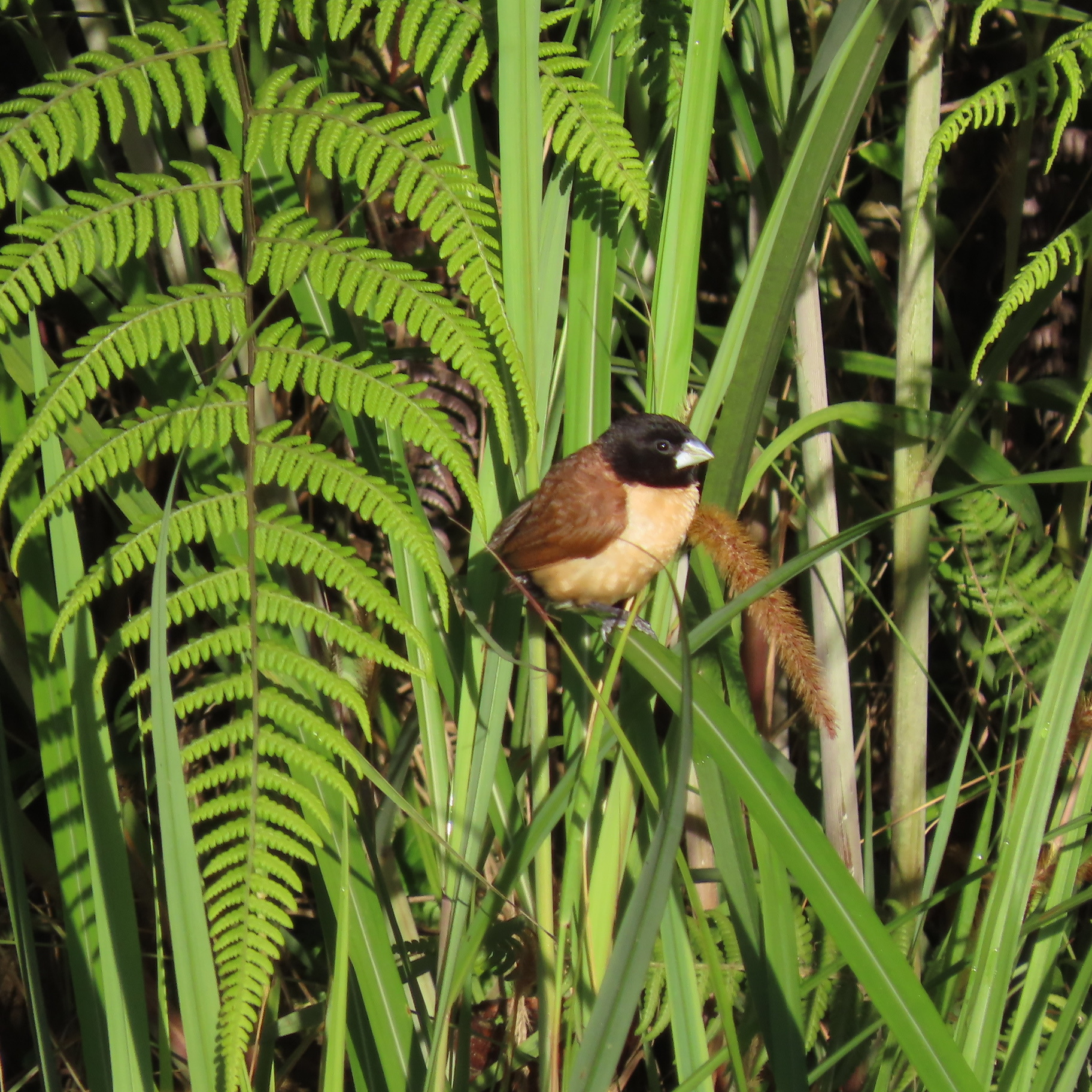

Conservation status
- Least Concern (IUCN 3.1)

Scientific classification
- Kingdom: Animalia
- Phylum: Chordata
- Class: Aves
- Order: Passeriformes
- Family: Estrildidae
- Genus: Lonchura
- Species: L. spectabilis

Binomial name
- Lonchura spectabilis (Sclater, PL, 1879)

Subspecies
- New Britain mannikin L. s. spectabilis Sclater, 1879; Mayr's hooded mannikin L. s. mayri Hartert, 1930; Gajduseki's hooded mannikin L. s. gajduseki Diamond, 1967; Wahgi hooded mannikin L. s. wahgiensis Mayr & Gilliard, 1957; Urimo hooded mannikin L. s. sepikensis Jonkers and Roersma, 1990; Karimui hooded mannikin L. s. "karimui" Coates, 1990; Koroba hooded mannikin L. s. "korobae" Coates, 1990; Guari hooded mannikin L. s. "guariae" Coates, 1990

= Hooded mannikin =

Species of bird

The hooded mannikin or hooded munia (Lonchura spectabilis), also known as the New Britain mannikin or Sclater's mannikin, is a species of estrildid finch found in New Britain and New Guinea.

== Description ==
The hooded mannikin is a small munia. It is whitish below, brown above and has a golden to orange rump. It is unlikely to be confused with other birds in its range. The juvenile is similar in appearance to the much larger in size juvenile great-billed mannikin L. grandis.

=== Subspecies ===
The hooded mannikin has eight recognized forms with only five subspecies that are recognized as follows:

- New Britain mannikin L. s. spectabilis (Nominate race): This species has a former scientific name Donacicola spectabilis. The entire head of the species is black, graduating in a series of scallops onto the mantle. The mantle, lower back, scapulars and wings are dark russet. The breast, belly and flanks are creamy-white. The rump and uppertail-coverts are orange. The tail is brown with orange to yellowish edges. Some faint brownish barring may appear on the lower flanks or greyish barring across the upper breast. The ventral region, thighs and undertail-coverts are black. The bill is grey, while the legs and feet are dark grey.
- Mayr's hooded mannikin L. s. mayri: This species has a former scientific name Munia spectabilis mayri. The entire head of the species is black so are the tail, ventral region, thighs, and undertail-coverts. The breast, belly and flanks are creamy-white. Some individuals may have a light brown barring on the flanks. The nape, mantle, lower back and wings are brown. There may have soft white terminal spots on the median wing-coverts, particularly in first-year birds. The rump and uppertail-coverts are light orangey yellow. The bill is pale blue-grey, small and stout on the culmen. The irides are chestnut. The legs and feet are variable and may be dark grey or even black
- Gajduseki's hooded mannikin L. s. gajduseki: The entire head of the species is black, as are the ventral region, thighs and undertail-coverts. The upperparts from nape to lower back, wings and tail are chestnut. The rump and undertail-coverts are orange (between L. s. mayri and L. s. spectabilis). The breast, belly and flanks are buff yellow. Both sexes are alike.
- Wahgi hooded mannikin L. s. wahgiensis: The entire head of the species is black, graduating on the nape in a series of black scallops. The back and wings are cinnamon brown. The rump, undertail-coverts and edges of the tail are orange yellow. The breast, belly and flanks are creamy-white. The ventral region, thighs, and undertail-coverts are black. The bill is a neat stout cone, blue-grey in color. The iridaws are chestnut, and the legs variable from grey to dark grey.
- Urimo hooded mannikin L. s. sepikensis: The entire head of the species is black. The breast, belly and flanks are cinnamon with the central region and undertail-coverts black. The mantle and wing-coverts ar3e brown. The primaries dark brown with paler brown edges to the outer webs. The uppertail-coverts and tail are brown.
- Karimui hooded mannikin L. s. "karimui": The entire head of the species is dark chocolate brown. The upperparts from nape to lower back, wings and tail are chestnut. The rump is orange graduating into yellow on the long uppertail-coverts and edges of the tail feathers. The breast, belly and flanks are warm bluff. The ventral region, thighs and undertail-coverts are black. This species may also referred as dark form of L. s. gajduseki.
- Koroba hooded mannikin L. s. "korobae": This species has fawn underparts which distinctly differ from other species.
- Guari hooded mannikin L. s. "guariae": This species has blackish head and upper throat, and dark brown on nape and hindneck. Breast, belly and uppertail-coverts buffy-ochraceous, and may have dark markings across the mid-breast and down the flanks.

=== Distribution of subspecies ===
- Nominate race occurs in island of New Britain, Long Island and Rooke Island.
- L. s. mayri occurs in Irian Jaya, ranging from the northern Lake Sentani area and the Cyclops mountains across into western East Sepik in Papua New Guinea.
- L. s. gajduseki occurs in eastern part of Chimbu Province
- L. s. wahgiensis occurs in the Herzog, Saruwaged and Bismarck Mountains of Morobe and Madang Provinces.
- L. s. sepikensis' occurs in the Sepik plains.
- L. s. "karimui" occurs in the western part of Chumbu.
- L. s. "korobae" occurs near Lanke Kopiago.
- L. s. "guariae" occurs in the Guari area in Central Province.

== Characteristics ==
=== Habitat ===
The hooded mannikin is a bird of foothills and mid-montane grassland. It is particularly fond of land that has been cleared by man.

=== Behaviour ===
The hooded mannikin is usually found in flocks of up to 30 or 40 individuals (Meyer 1930). The species is so unwary of man that it could be stalked and caught by hand (Diamond 1967). A bonded pair will always stay close to each other. It has been seen that the male will stay alert for danger, while his mate feeds or bathes. When the female files off, the male will follow immediately.

=== Call and song ===
Both sexes have peep or seep call. However, the loud call note of both sexes is different. The female will have a double-noted sileep or tsilip. The male will have a clear single note seep or tseep.

The song consists of entirely of a series high-pitched weee notes. After several wees the male may produce up to 20 pee notes, one after another. There is a soft, more complex subsong, uttered by a male in social situation or when alone.

=== Food ===
It is observed that the hooded mannikin feeds on seeds of the introduced grass Rottboellia exaltata' as large as rice grains. They habitually feed by clinging to the stems of the growing grasses and plucking seeds from the inflorescences.

According to the Kalam native, Hooded mannikins are very fond of the algae that forms a scum on stagnant pools and puddles. The local will shoot them at these sites when they are preoccupied with their feeding. They also say that

...most people will eat (hooded munias) but some adult men will not, and neither on the whole will the young unmarried or newly-married men and women... because the munias has big families, and newly-married couple don't want to have a whole lot of children very fast.

=== Courtship and display ===
An unpaired male in healthy condition will sing advertisement songs directed at particularly nothing. He will begin singing with his head level, and bill opening and closing and a slight hint of bobbing. But soon his body will become motionless.

However, when a female is near-by, the male may preface his display by flying about with a bit of nesting material. (Goodwin 1982) He will lower himself and edges along the perch and twists towards her. He will begin to sing with body upright, head pointed towards the bird. The head is held level or slightly downward, the throat is pumping and the weee song becomes pulsating. The flanks and belly feathers are fluffed out. In the final stage of the display, the head is stretched up fully, the bill is held wide open without any movement of the mandibles. And the head is turned from side to side. Then he edges towards her maybe with little hops with the intention to mount. There is no noticeable movement and the song is continual high-pitched trill. This is when the high extended peeeeeee part of the song is uttered.

=== Breeding ===
The breeding season is in October, at the time the taro is setting its new shoots. The female may lay five to six eggs. If you find a nest with droppings in it, you will know that a whole family are using it for a roost, and it is known as a Young men's house.

The nest is a flattish ovoid of grasses, staw and finer stems and fibres. It is usually placed in grasses or in a bush. The location of the site undoubtedly influences the shape and the size of the nest, as with most munias.
