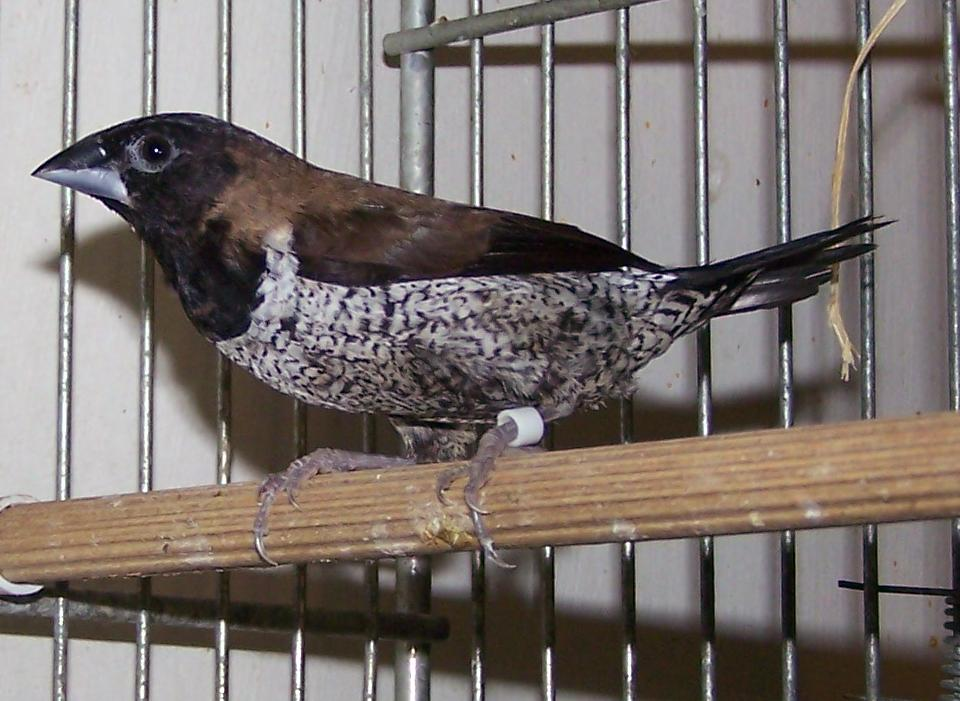

Conservation status
- Least Concern (IUCN 3.1)

Scientific classification
- Kingdom: Animalia
- Phylum: Chordata
- Class: Aves
- Order: Passeriformes
- Family: Estrildidae
- Genus: Lonchura
- Species: L. molucca

Binomial name
- Lonchura molucca (Linnaeus, 1766)

Synonyms
- Loxia molucca Linnaeus, 1766

= Black-faced munia =

Species of bird

The black-faced munia (Lonchura molucca) is a species of estrildid finch found in Indonesia and East Timor. It occurs in a wide range of habitats including artificial landscapes (e.g. parks and gardens), forest, grassland and savannah. It was first described by the Swedish naturalist Carl Linnaeus in the twelfth edition of his Systema Naturae in 1766. The IUCN has evaluated the status of this bird as being of least concern.

== Taxonomy ==
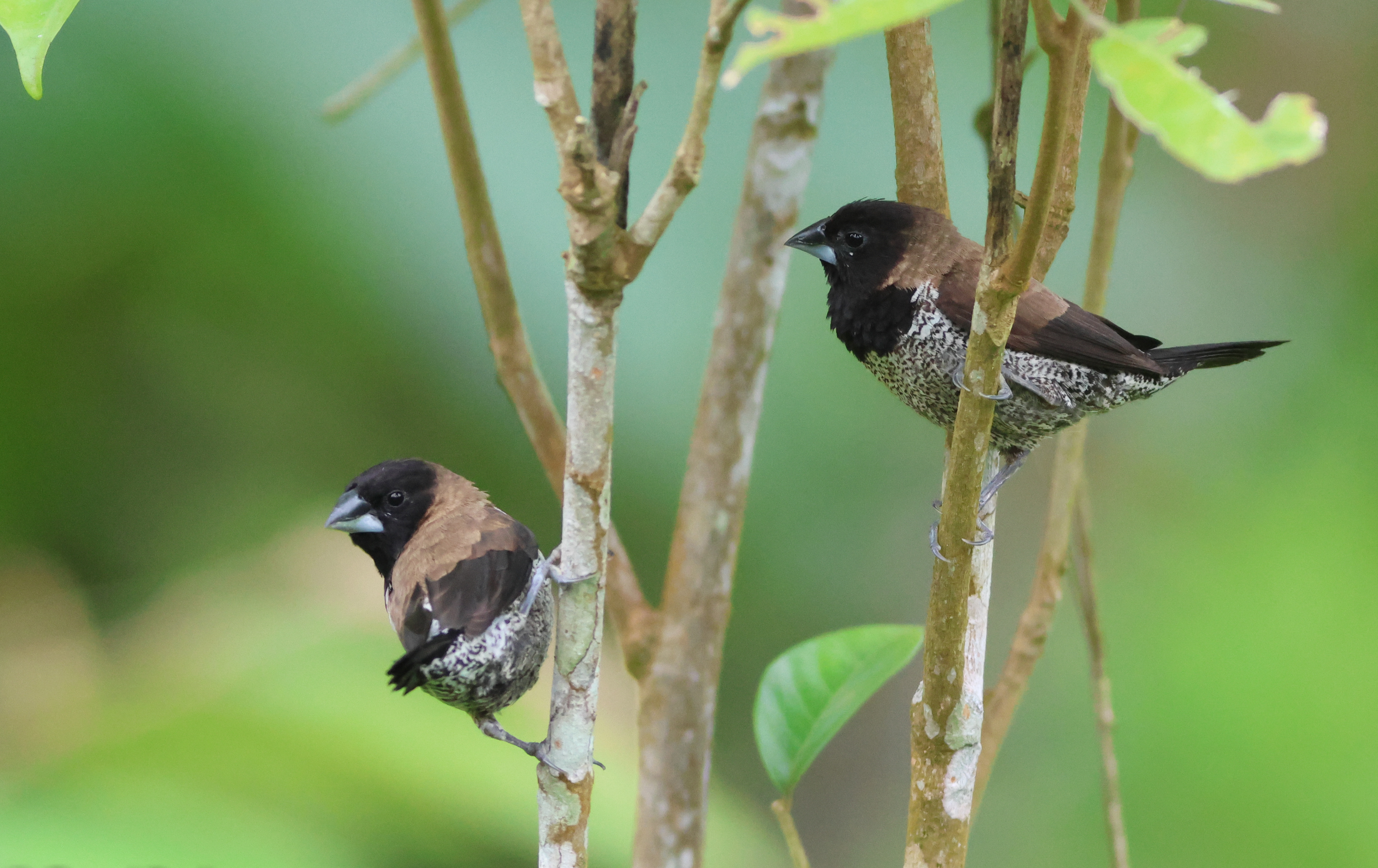
Black-faced Munia from Tomohon, North Sulawesi

In 1760 the French zoologist Mathurin Jacques Brisson included a description of the black-faced munia in his Ornithologie based on a specimen collected from the Maluku Islands. He used the French name Le gros-bec de Moluques and the Latin Coccothraustes Moluccensis. Although Brisson coined Latin names, these do not conform to the binomial system and are not recognised by the International Commission on Zoological Nomenclature. When in 1766 the Swedish naturalist Carl Linnaeus updated his Systema Naturae for the twelfth edition, he added 240 species that had been previously described by Brisson. One of these was the black-faced munia. Linnaeus included a brief description, coined the binomial name Loxia molucca and cited Brisson's work. The specific name molucca denotes the Moluccas islands. This species is now placed in the genus Lonchura that was introduced by the English naturalist William Henry Sykes in 1832.

There are two subspecies:

- L. m. molucca (Linnaeus, 1766) – Sulawesi and nearby islands, most of the Moluccas, Gag and Kofiau Islands
- L. m. propinqua (Sharpe, 1890) – Kangean Islands, Lesser Sundas east to the Tanimbar Islands

== Description ==
The black-faced munia has a black face, throat, and upper breast. The nape and back are dark brown, and the wings and tail are black. The underparts and rump are white with fine black speckling or barring. The bill is thick and bicoloured, with a dark upper mandible and blue-gray lower mandible, and the legs are dark.

== Distribution ==
The black-faced munia is native to Indonesia including the island group of Wallacea. It is also present in East Timor. It is a seed-eating bird and is found in small flocks in grassy areas.

== Status ==
The black-faced munia has a wide range and is said to be abundant in some places and common in many others. The population in Indonesia has not been evaluated but the population trend seems to be steady. The bird is facing few identified threats and the International Union for Conservation of Nature has assessed its conservation status as being of "least concern".
