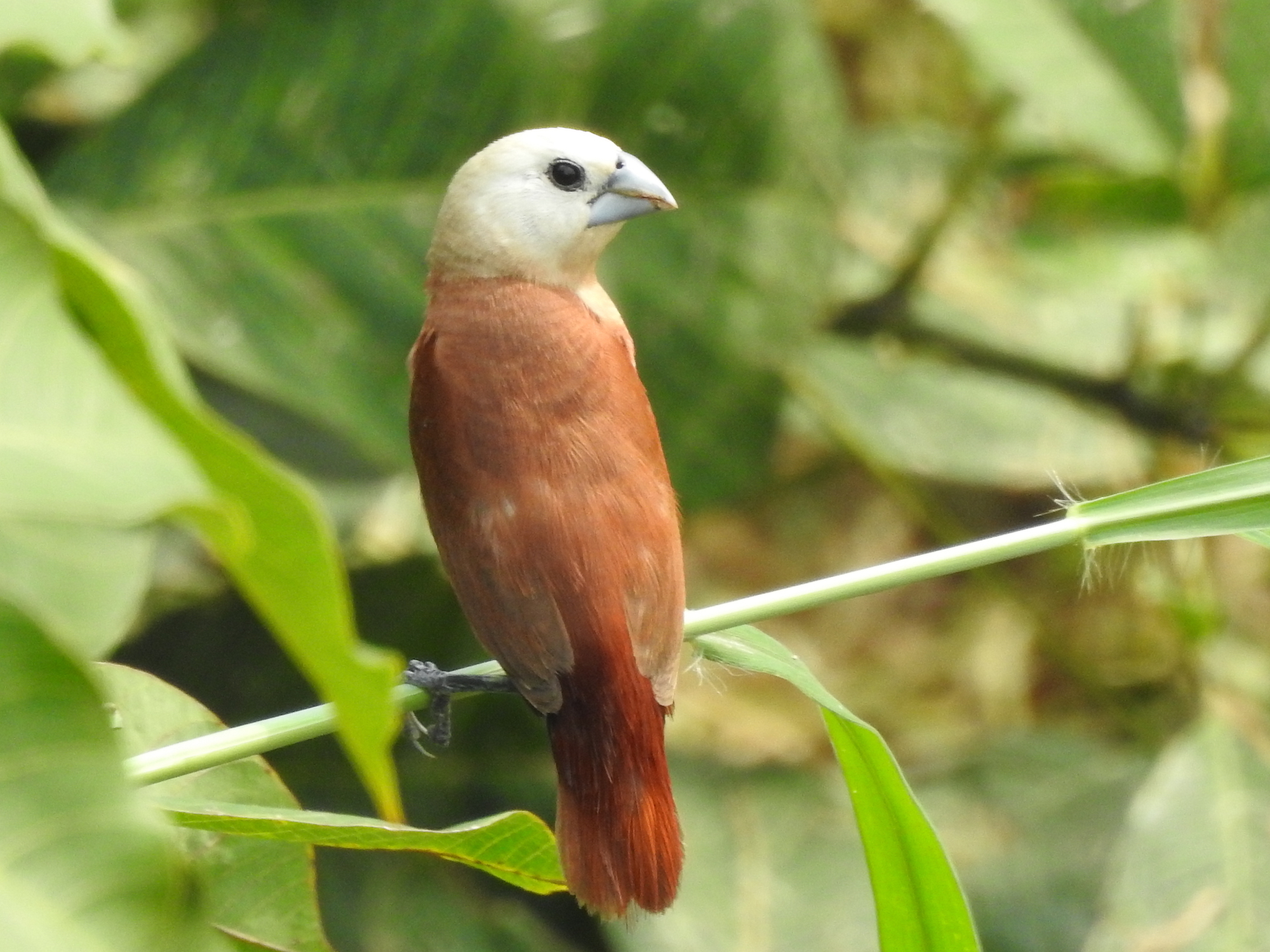
- In Malaysia

Conservation status
- Least Concern (IUCN 3.1)

Scientific classification
- Kingdom: Animalia
- Phylum: Chordata
- Class: Aves
- Order: Passeriformes
- Family: Estrildidae
- Genus: Lonchura
- Species: L. maja

Binomial name
- Lonchura maja (Linnaeus, 1766)

Synonyms
- Loxia maja Linnaeus, 1766

= White-headed munia =

Species of bird

The white-headed munia (Lonchura maja) is a small passerine bird belonging to the estrildid finch family. This species is often confused with, and referred to as, the Pale-headed munia (Lonchura pallida) which can be differentiated by tan coloured flanks which are lighter than the brown wings and also by the absence of the black belly.

== Taxonomy ==
The white-headed munia was formally described in 1766 by the Swedish naturalist Carl Linnaeus in the twelfth edition of his Systema Naturae under the binomial name Loxia maja. Linnaeus cited George Edwards's "The Malacca Gros-beak" and Mathurin Jacques Brisson's "Le Maia de la Chine". The English naturalist John Ray used the word "Maia" for a Cuban bird in 1768. Linnaeus specified the locality as East India. This was amended to Malacca in 1924. The white-headed munia is now placed in the genus Lonchura that was introduced by the English naturalist William Henry Sykes in 1832. It is treated as monotypic: no subspecies are recognised.

== Appearance and size ==
The White-headed munia has a distinctive chocolate-brown body and a contrasting white head and throat. They are typically 11 cm in length and weigh around 11 grams. Adult birds have chestnut brown upperparts, flanks and wings, an entirely white head, throat, and upper breast which is tinged with buff. The tail is black-brown and the belly is black. The bill and legs are light grey.

=== Sexual dimorphism ===
There is very subtle sexual dimorphism in adult birds, with the head of the male being whiter than that of the female and getting whiter with age. This often causes young male birds to be confused with females. Additionally, the definition line between the breast and the flanks is more pronounced in the male.

=== Juveniles ===
Juvenile birds are more cinnamon coloured above with a buff face and underparts, a brown iris, grey bill and blue-grey feet. They are practically impossible to differentiate from juveniles of other species such as the White-capped munia (Lonchura ferruginosa), Pale-headed munia (Lonchura pallida), Chestnut munia (Lonchura atricapilla) or the Scaly-breasted munia (Lonchura punctulata).

== Distribution and habitat ==
This species is native to Southeast Asia, including countries like Indonesia, Thailand, Malaysia, Vietnam and Singapore. White-headed munias are commonly found in tropical and subtropical habitats, including grasslands, wetlands, and cultivated areas. They are often associated with rice fields.

== Diet, social behavior, nesting, and breeding ==
=== Diet ===
The White-headed munia's diet mainly consists of seeds, especially grass seeds and rice grains.

=== Social behavior ===
The White-headed munia are social birds and are usually seen in flocks.

=== Nesting ===
- Both the male and female participate in nest construction.
- They build a dome-shaped nest, typically low in vegetation, often near or over water.
- The nest is made from woven grass, leaves, and other plant fibers. It's a fairly bulky structure with a side entrance.
- The female lays a clutch of 4 to 7 white eggs.
- Both parents incubate the eggs.
- The incubation period lasts for about 11-13 days.

=== Breeding ===
The breeding season of the White-headed munia usually coincides with the availability of food, often during or after the rainy season. This can vary depending on the specific location.
