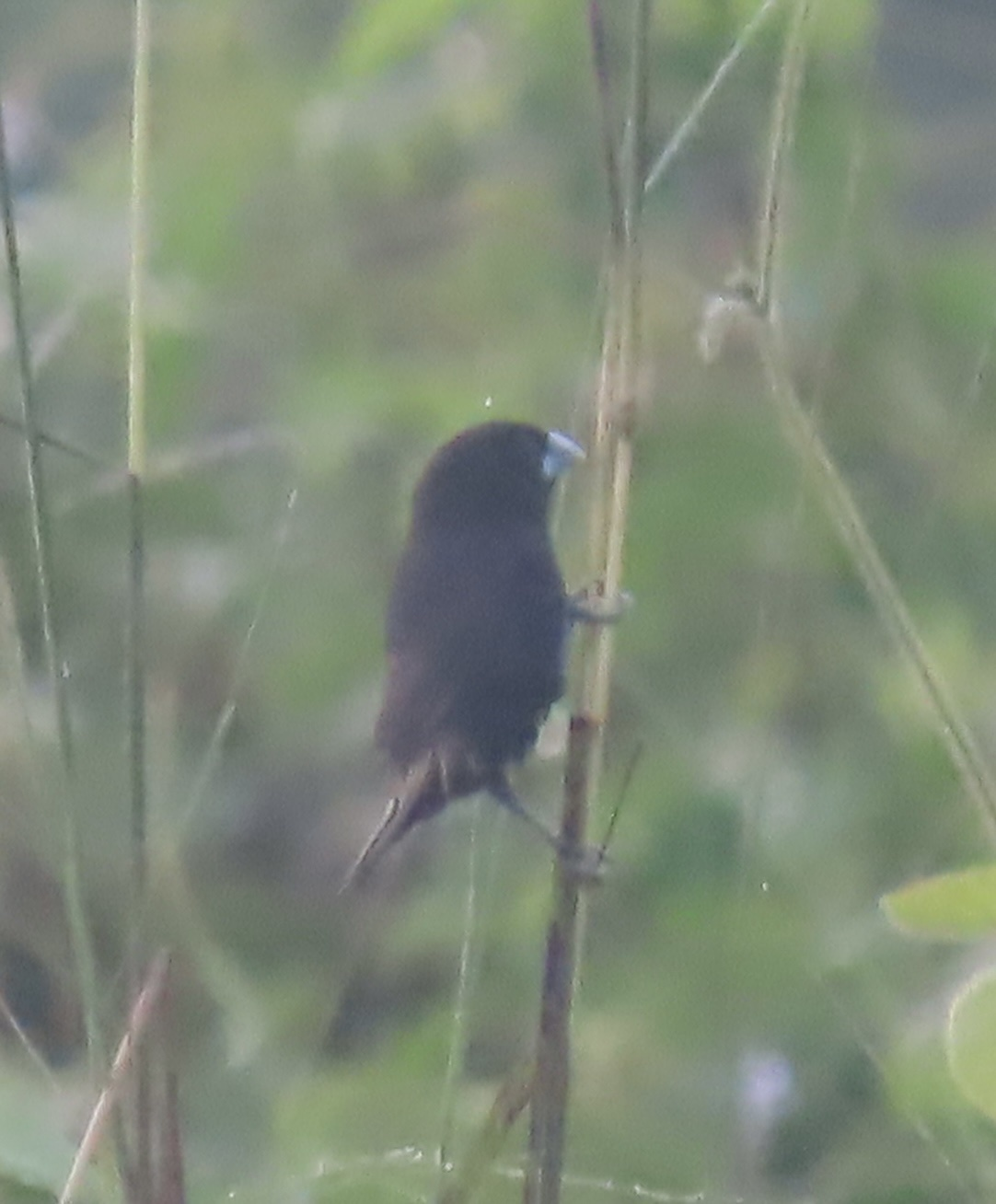

Conservation status
- Least Concern (IUCN 3.1)

Scientific classification
- Kingdom: Animalia
- Phylum: Chordata
- Class: Aves
- Order: Passeriformes
- Family: Estrildidae
- Genus: Lonchura
- Species: L. stygia

Binomial name
- Lonchura stygia Stresemann, 1934
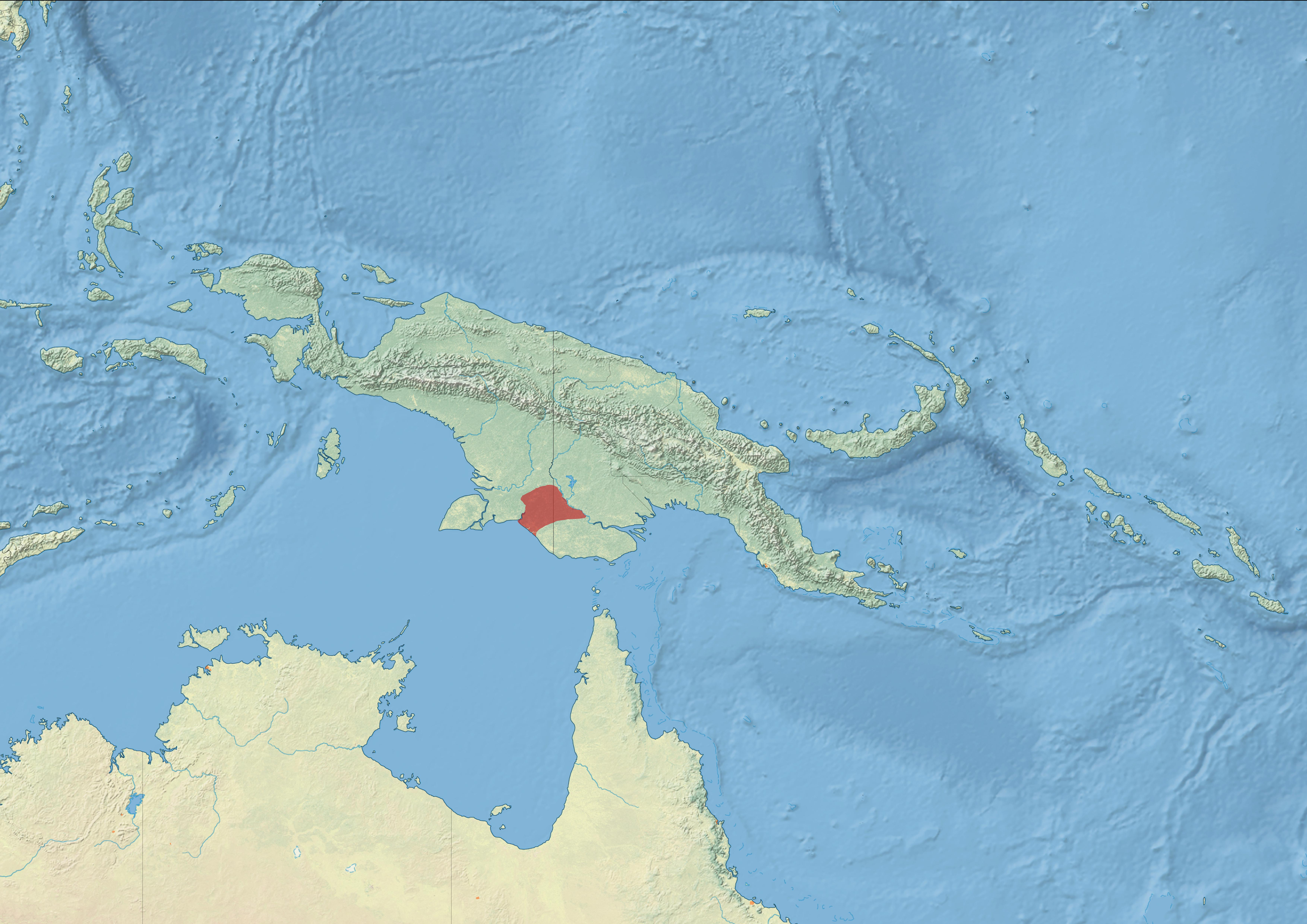
- distribution

= Black mannikin =

Species of bird

The black mannikin (Lonchura stygia) or black munia, is a species of estrildid finch found in New Guinea, from Mandum (Papua, formerly known as Irian Jaya, Indonesia) to Lake Daviumbu, Papua New Guinea. It is commonly found in flocks of maximum 20 birds, inhabiting savannas, wetlands, but sometimes they were also seen at rice crops.

== Threats ==
This species is threatened by the destruction of reedbeds due to the introduction of rusa deer (Cervus timorensis). They are also probably threatened by the encroachment of woodland on grasslands, due to increased numbers of livestock such as pigs. It is also adversely affected by the cage-bird trade.
