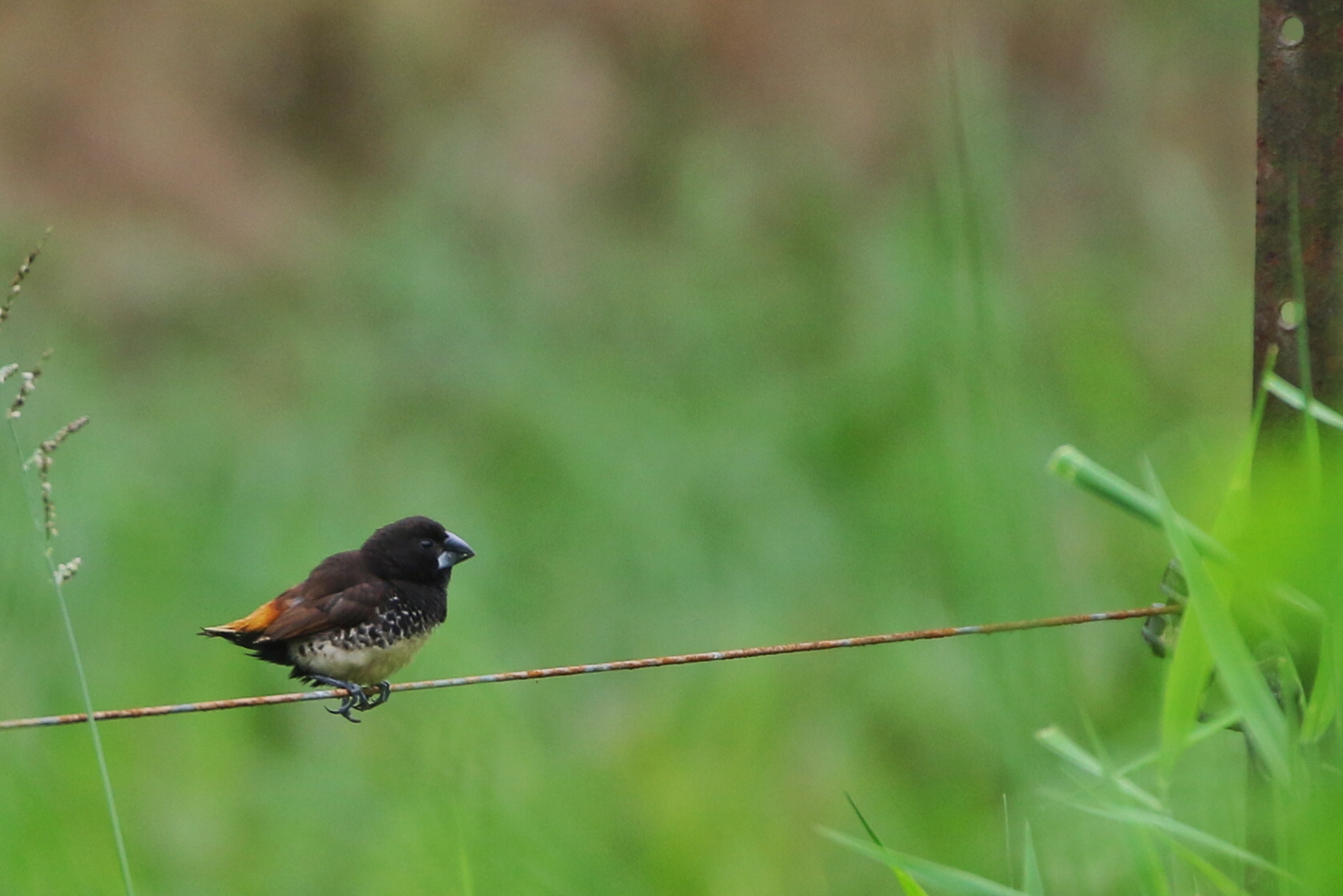

Conservation status
- Least Concern (IUCN 3.1)

Scientific classification
- Kingdom: Animalia
- Phylum: Chordata
- Class: Aves
- Order: Passeriformes
- Family: Estrildidae
- Genus: Lonchura
- Species: L. melaena

Binomial name
- Lonchura melaena (Sclater, PL, 1880)

= Buff-bellied mannikin =

Species of bird

The buff-bellied mannikin (Lonchura melaena), also known as the sooty munia or Bismarck munia, is a species of estrildid finch found in New Britain and Buka Island. It has an estimated global extent of occurrence of 20,000 to 50,000 km^{2}.

It is found in subtropical and tropical dry grassland habitat. The status of the species is evaluated as Least Concern.
