= New Hanover mannikin =

Conservation status
- Least Concern (IUCN 3.1)

Scientific classification
- Kingdom: Animalia
- Phylum: Chordata
- Class: Aves
- Order: Passeriformes
- Family: Estrildidae
- Genus: Lonchura
- Species: L. nigerrima

Binomial name
- Lonchura nigerrima (Rothschild & Hartert, EJO, 1899)

Species of bird

New Hanover mannikin (Lonchura nigerrima) is a species of estrildid finch breeding in New Hannover. It has an estimated global extent of occurrence of 20,000 to 50,000 km^{2}. It is found in subtropical/ tropical (lowland) dry grassland habitat. The New Hanover mannikin has sometimes been treated as a subspecies of Mottled mannikin. The status of Mottled mannikin (with New Hanover mannikin included) is evaluated as Least Concern.
