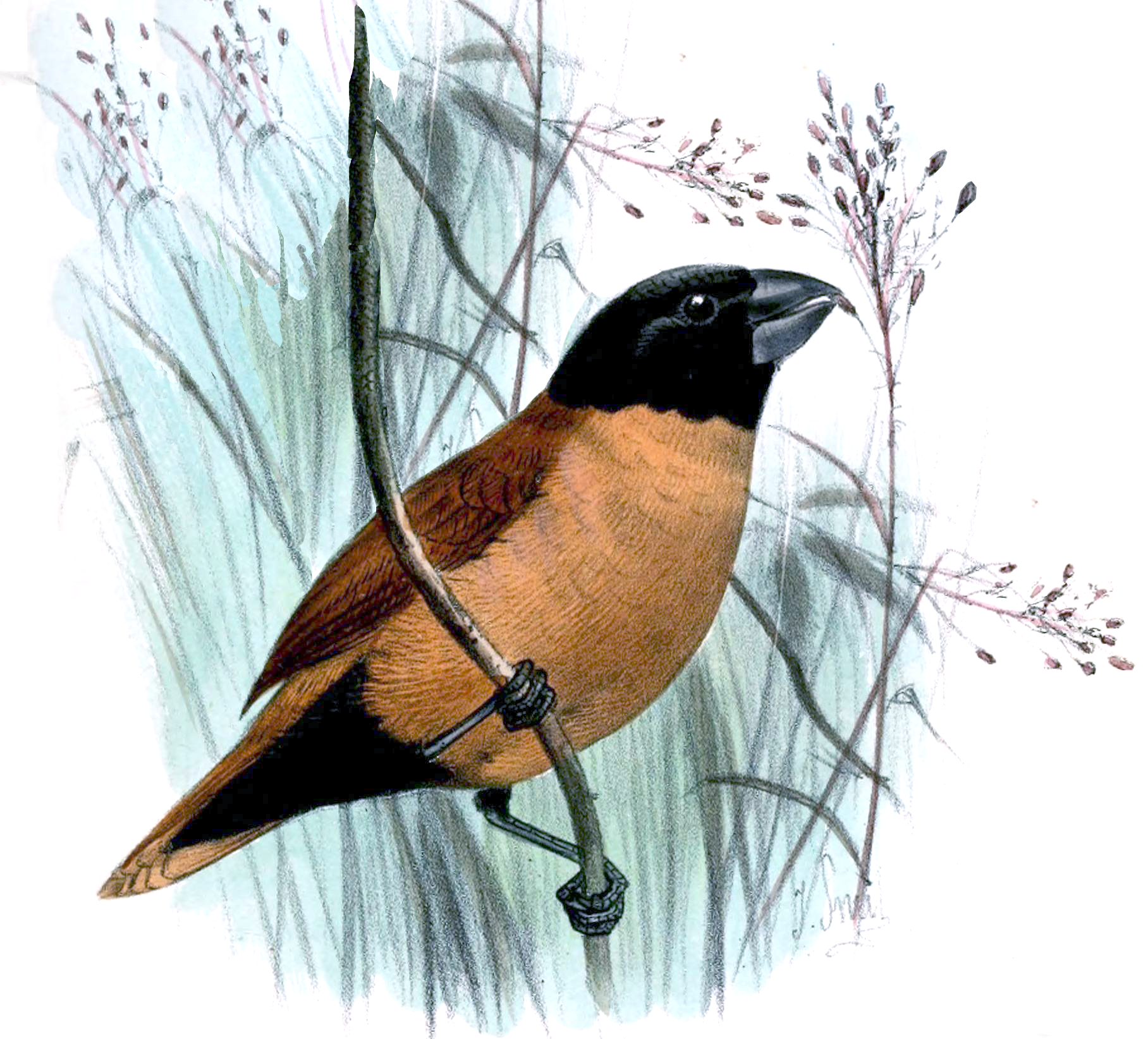

Conservation status
- Least Concern (IUCN 3.1)

Scientific classification
- Kingdom: Animalia
- Phylum: Chordata
- Class: Aves
- Order: Passeriformes
- Family: Estrildidae
- Genus: Lonchura
- Species: L. forbesi

Binomial name
- Lonchura forbesi (Sclater, PL, 1879)

= Forbes's mannikin =

Species of bird

Forbes's mannikin (Lonchura forbesi) or the New Ireland munia, is a species of estrildid finch breeding in Papua New Guinea. It has an estimated global extent of occurrence of 20,000 to 50,000 km^{2} (7,700 to 19,300 sq mi). It is found in subtropical or tropical lowland dry grassland habitat. The status of the species is evaluated as Least Concern.
