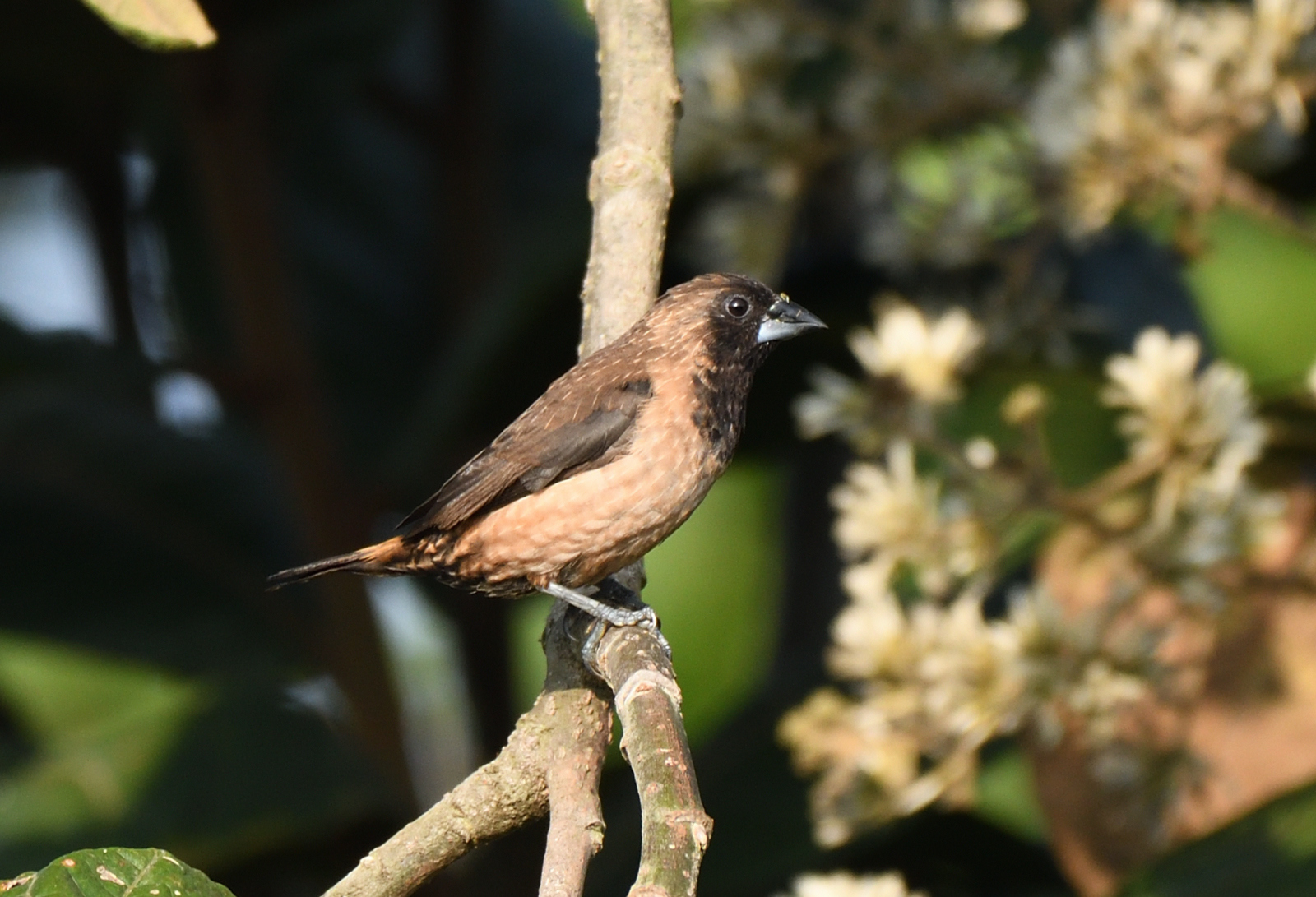
- Lonchura kelaarti jerdoni

Conservation status
- Least Concern (IUCN 3.1)

Scientific classification
- Kingdom: Animalia
- Phylum: Chordata
- Class: Aves
- Order: Passeriformes
- Family: Estrildidae
- Genus: Lonchura
- Species: L. kelaarti

Binomial name
- Lonchura kelaarti (Jerdon, 1863)

= Black-throated munia =

Species of bird

The black-throated munia or Jerdon's mannikin (Lonchura kelaarti) is a small passerine bird. This estrildid finch is a resident breeding bird in the hills of southwest India, the Western Ghats, Eastern Ghats and Sri Lanka.

== Habitat ==
The black-throated munia is a small gregarious bird which feeds mainly on seeds. It frequents open hill woodland and cultivation. The nest is a large domed grass structure in a tree or creepers on a house into which 3-8 white eggs are laid in India, and usually five in Sri Lanka.

== Characteristics ==
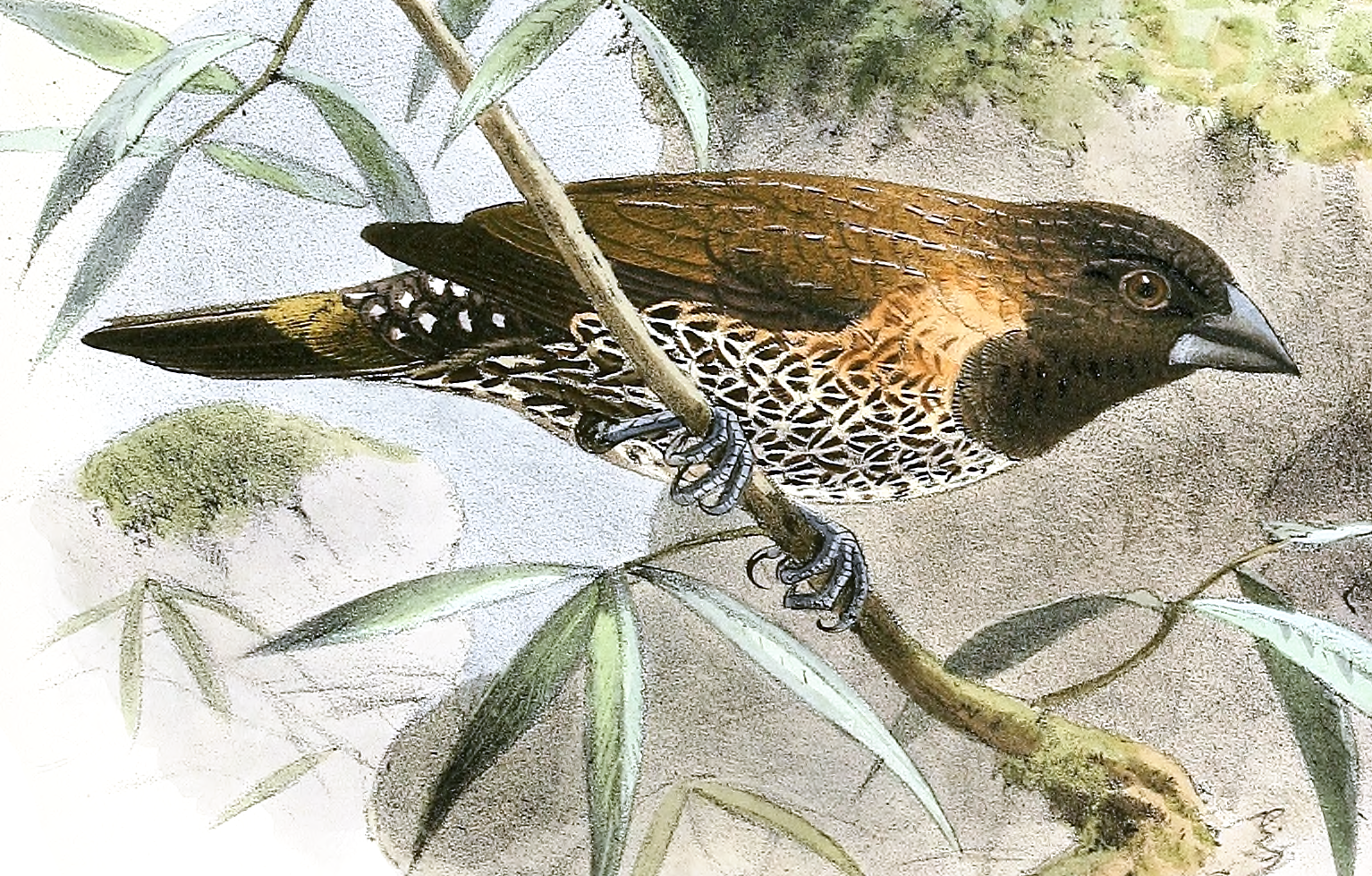
L. k. kelaarti by J. G. Keulemans (1880)

The black-throated munia is 12cm in length with a long black tail. The adult of the southwest Indian population, L. k. jerdoni, has a stubby grey bill, dark brown upperparts with pale shaft streaks; a blackish face and bib; and pinkish brown underparts with scaly marking towards the vent. The Eastern Ghats form vernayi has paler pinkish underparts. The nominate form L. k. kelaarti of Sri Lanka has scaly patterning on the underparts and vent with the pale almost whitish shaft streaks contrasting on the darker back. The sexes are similar in all populations, but immatures lack the darker face and have more uniform underparts.

== Commemoration ==
The binomial commemorates the zoologist Edward Frederick Kelaart and the name was given by Thomas C. Jerdon in 1863.
