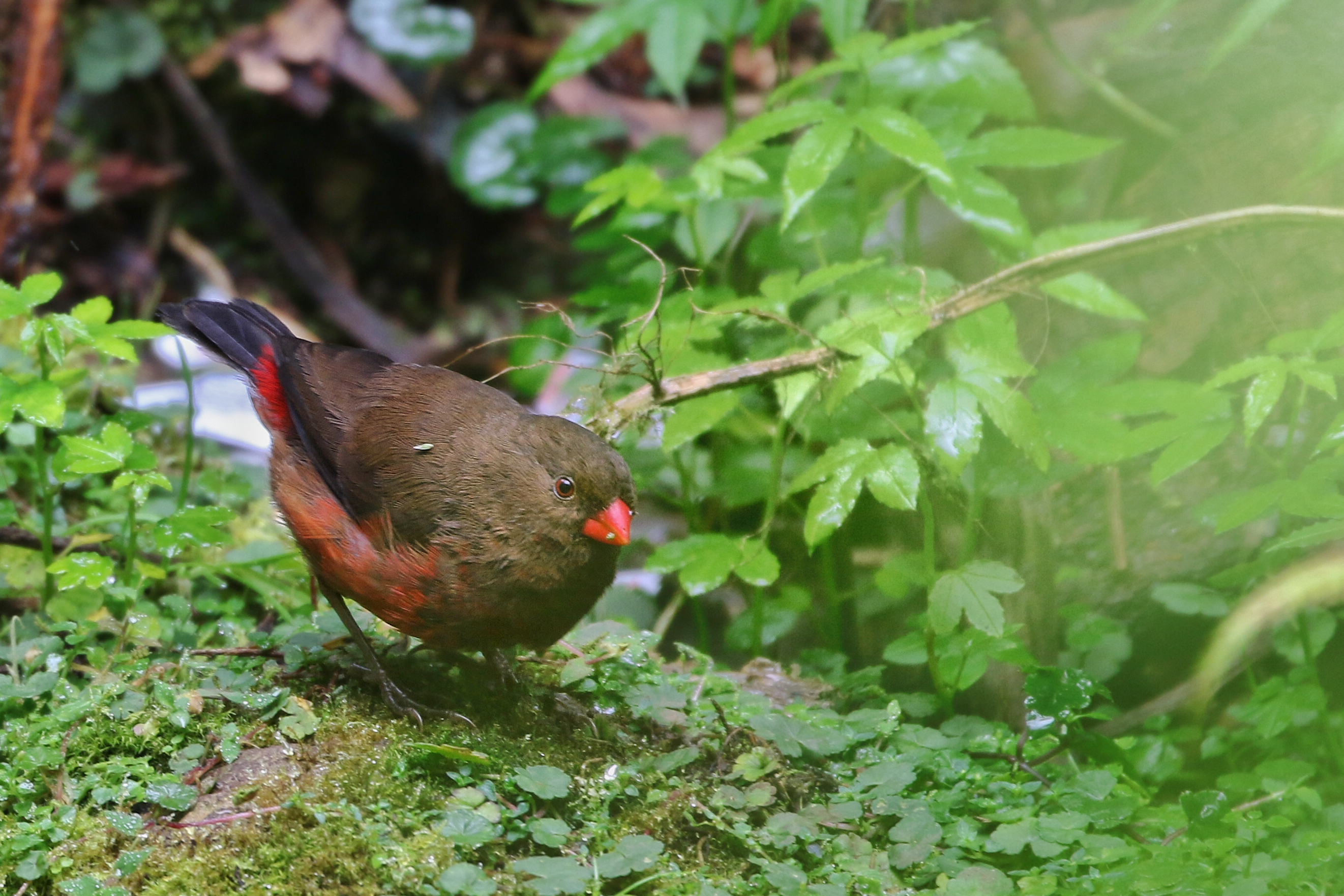

Conservation status
- Least Concern (IUCN 3.1)

Scientific classification
- Kingdom: Animalia
- Phylum: Chordata
- Class: Aves
- Order: Passeriformes
- Family: Estrildidae
- Genus: Oreostruthus; De Vis, 1898
- Species: O. fuliginosus

Binomial name
- Oreostruthus fuliginosus (De Vis, 1897)

= Mountain firetail =

Species of bird

The mountain firetail (Oreostruthus fuliginosus) is a common species of estrildid finch found in New Guinea. It has an estimated global extent of occurrence of 20,000–50,000 km^{2} (7,700–19,300 sq mi). It is the only species in the genus Oreostruthus.

It is commonly found in upper montane forest edge and shrubby borders of subalpine grasslands across the central highlands of New Guinea. The IUCN has classified the species as being of least concern.
