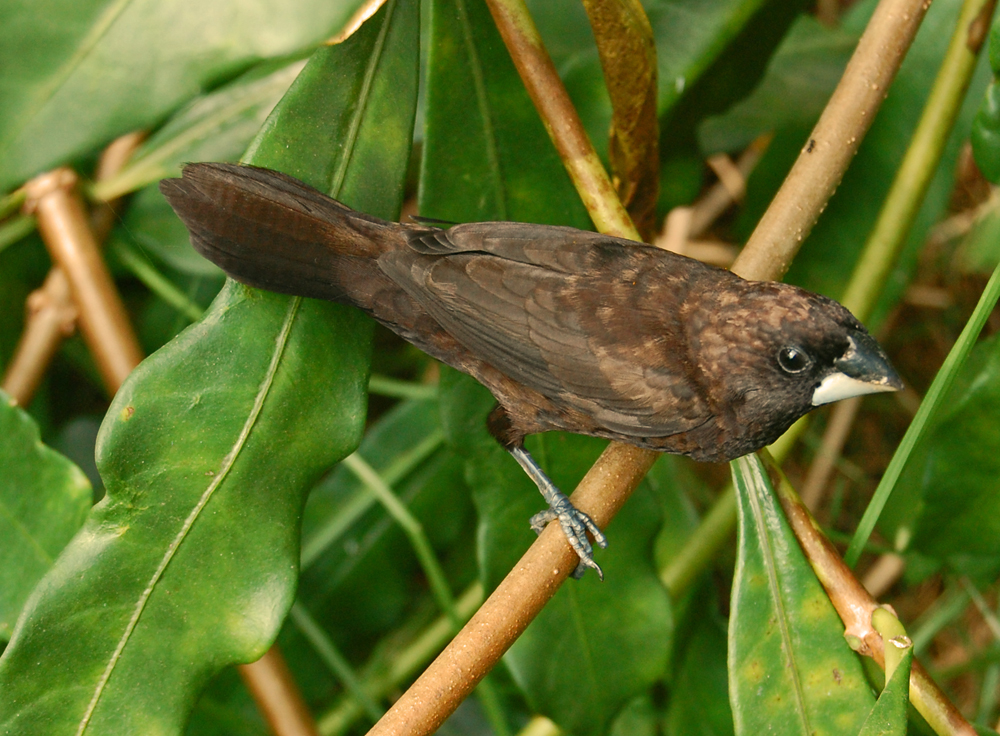
- from Upper Mentaya, Central Kalimantan

Conservation status
- Least Concern (IUCN 3.1)

Scientific classification
- Kingdom: Animalia
- Phylum: Chordata
- Class: Aves
- Order: Passeriformes
- Family: Estrildidae
- Genus: Lonchura
- Species: L. fuscans

Binomial name
- Lonchura fuscans (Cassin, 1852)

= Dusky munia =

Species of bird

The dusky munia (Lonchura fuscans) is a species in the estrildid finch Family and is endemic to Borneo. It is also commonly referred to as the Dusky mannikin and the Bornean munia. It is in the genus Lonchura and is a monotypic species, so there are no subspecies.

== Distribution and habitat ==
The status of the species is evaluated as Least Concern. It is most commonly spotted on the Island Borneo, but can be found in Brunei, Indonesia, Malaysia, and the Philippines. It is also an introduced species in Natuna, Banggi, Cagayan and Sulu Islands. While the population size of the species is unknown, the population growth is stable, and virtually unthreatened. It is found in subtropical/ tropical lowland shrubland, forest and grassland habitat. Its habitat can vary widely, with sightings being recorded in the foothills of the island Borneo, grasslands, and agricultural fields such as rice paddy fields. They also tend to reside along riverbanks, reed-beds, secondary scrub and cultivated areas, from sea-level all the way up to 500 meters above ground. They are not migrants, and do not venture outside of their habitat during seasonal changes like many other species of birds.

== Description ==
The dusky munia is a smaller perching bird, with adults growing to reach a body length of 10 to 11 centimeters long, and weighing in at 9.5 grams. Their plumage is a rich dark brown, with feathers of its crown streaked pale brown, and blue-gray legs. It has a gray ring around its eye, and is dark around the face, with a bill that has a black upper mandible, and a blue-gray lower mandible. There is no distinction in feather pattern between male or female.

== Ecology ==
=== Song and call ===
The call of the dusky munia has a few variations. During flight, it calls out with a low-toned "teck teck". While on the ground or in a tree, it can call out a shrill "pee pee", a high-pitched "peep" or a thin "chirrup".

=== Diet ===
Its diet consists of grass seeds, seeds of weeds, rice grains, and insects. When searching for food, they mainly look through vegetation and on the ground. They also carefully pick out seeds from overturned clumps of earth and buffalo dung, as well as from seed heads and deep in the ground. Most Dusky Munia's feed primarily on seeds, with grass seed making up an important part of the diet for many species. In addition, snails, omnivores, figs, ants, insects, nectar, berries and algae are digested by a few species. They fly in flocks while communicating with gentle whistles. These species are exceedingly social and likely will mate and doze to sleep with other Munia species.

=== Reproduction ===
The females in the species build their nests out of bits of collected grass, or take over abandoned nests built by smaller birds (chestnut munia). Nesting can occur in a wide variety of different environments, but preferred conditions are dark, elevated spaces or small crevices. Many nest in caves, holes in river banks, bushes, dense trees, hollow trees, and roots of fallen trees. Once the nest has been fully constructed, it is used for roosting, breeding and incubating. After breeding, the female lays clutches of an average of 4-6 eggs. Larger clutches can get up to 8 eggs. The average incubation period for a clutch of eggs is 13-14 days, depending on size. Once hatched, the young fledge after three weeks in the nest.
