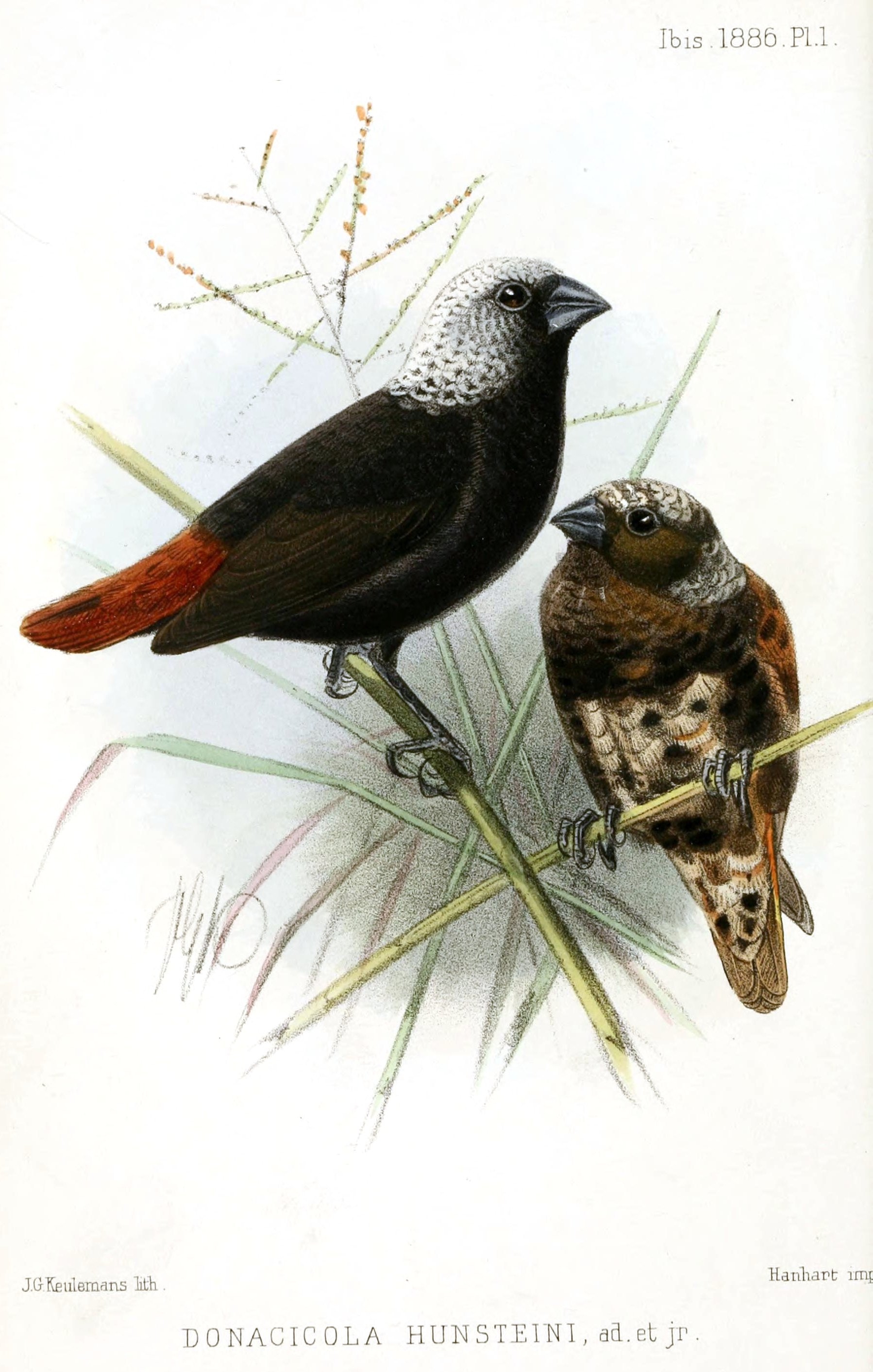

Conservation status
- Least Concern (IUCN 3.1)

Scientific classification
- Kingdom: Animalia
- Phylum: Chordata
- Class: Aves
- Order: Passeriformes
- Family: Estrildidae
- Genus: Lonchura
- Species: L. hunsteini

Binomial name
- Lonchura hunsteini (Finsch, 1886)

= Mottled mannikin =

Species of bird

Mottled mannikin or mottled munia (Lonchura hunsteini) is a species of estrildid finch breeding in New Ireland. This species is also introduced to Pohnpei. It has an estimated global extent of occurrence of 20,000 to 50,000 km^{2}. It is found in subtropical/ tropical (lowland) dry grassland habitat. The New Hanover mannikin has sometimes been treated as a subspecies of mottled mannikin with the name Hunstein's mannikin for the combined taxa. The status of mottled mannikin (with New Hanover mannikin included) is evaluated as Least Concern. The males are similarly colored to the extinct Hawaiian ʻUla ʻAi Hāwane, a Hawaiian honeycreeper.
