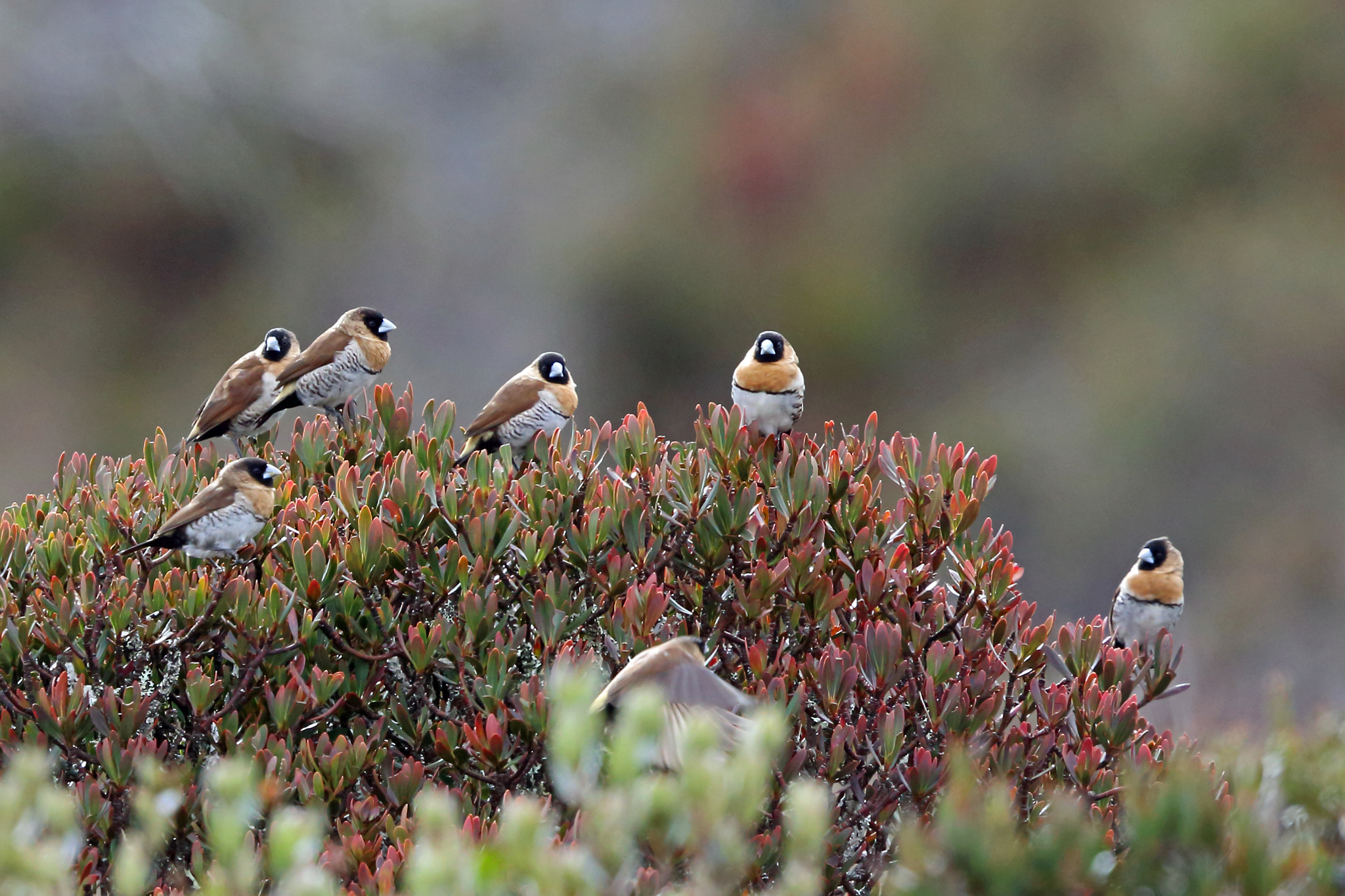

Conservation status
- Least Concern (IUCN 3.1)

Scientific classification
- Kingdom: Animalia
- Phylum: Chordata
- Class: Aves
- Order: Passeriformes
- Family: Estrildidae
- Genus: Lonchura
- Species: L. montana

Binomial name
- Lonchura montana Junge, 1939

= Western alpine mannikin =

Species of bird

The western alpine mannikin (Lonchura montana) also known as Snow Mountain mannikin or western alpine munia is a small, approximately 11.5 cm long, estrildid finch. Both sexes are similar with dark brown plumage, black face, buff chest and black-barred white abdomen. The young has black bill, dark brown plumage and buffy-white below.

Endemic to Indonesia, the western alpine mannikin is distributed in alpine grassland of the Snow Mountains and Star Mountains in western New Guinea. It usually found in flocks of six to twenty birds. The diet consists mainly of seeds, grasses and other vegetation.

A common species in its limited habitat range, the western alpine mannikin is evaluated as being of least concern on the IUCN Red List of Threatened Species.
