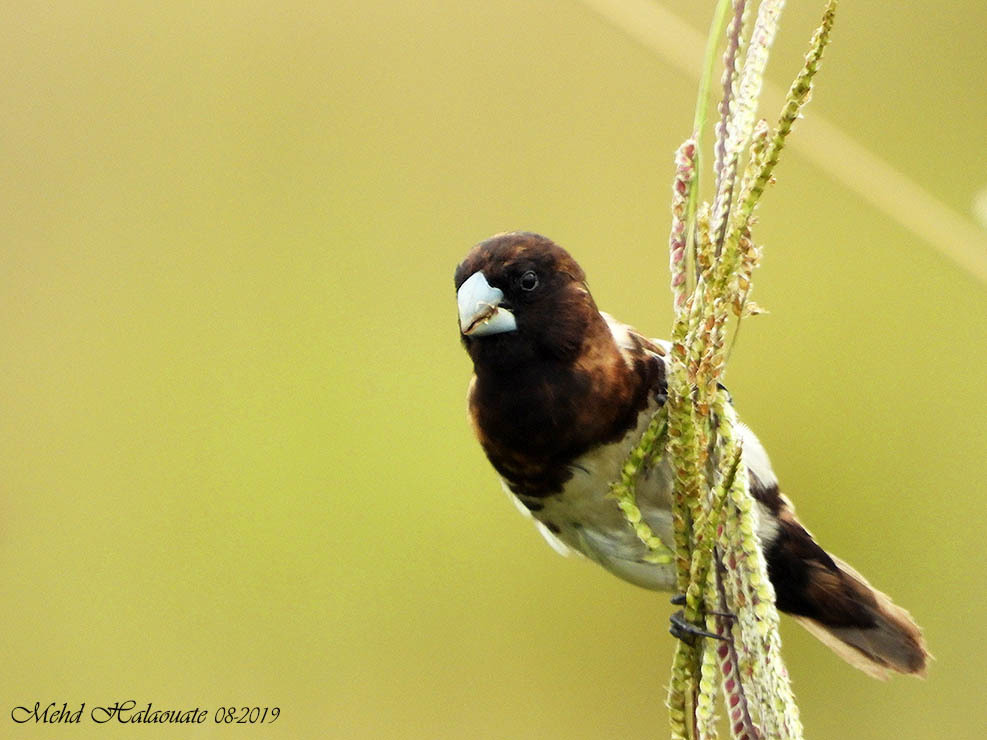

Conservation status
- Least Concern (IUCN 3.1)

Scientific classification
- Kingdom: Animalia
- Phylum: Chordata
- Class: Aves
- Order: Passeriformes
- Family: Estrildidae
- Genus: Lonchura
- Species: L. teerinki

Binomial name
- Lonchura teerinki Rand, 1940

= Black-breasted mannikin =

Species of bird

The black-breasted mannikin (Lonchura teerinki), also known as black-breasted munia, is a species of estrildid finch endemic to West Papua, Indonesia. It has an estimated global extent of occurrence of 20,000 to 50,000 km^{2}. It is found in subtropical/ tropical lowland dry shrubland and high altitude grassland habitat. The status of the species is Least Concern.
