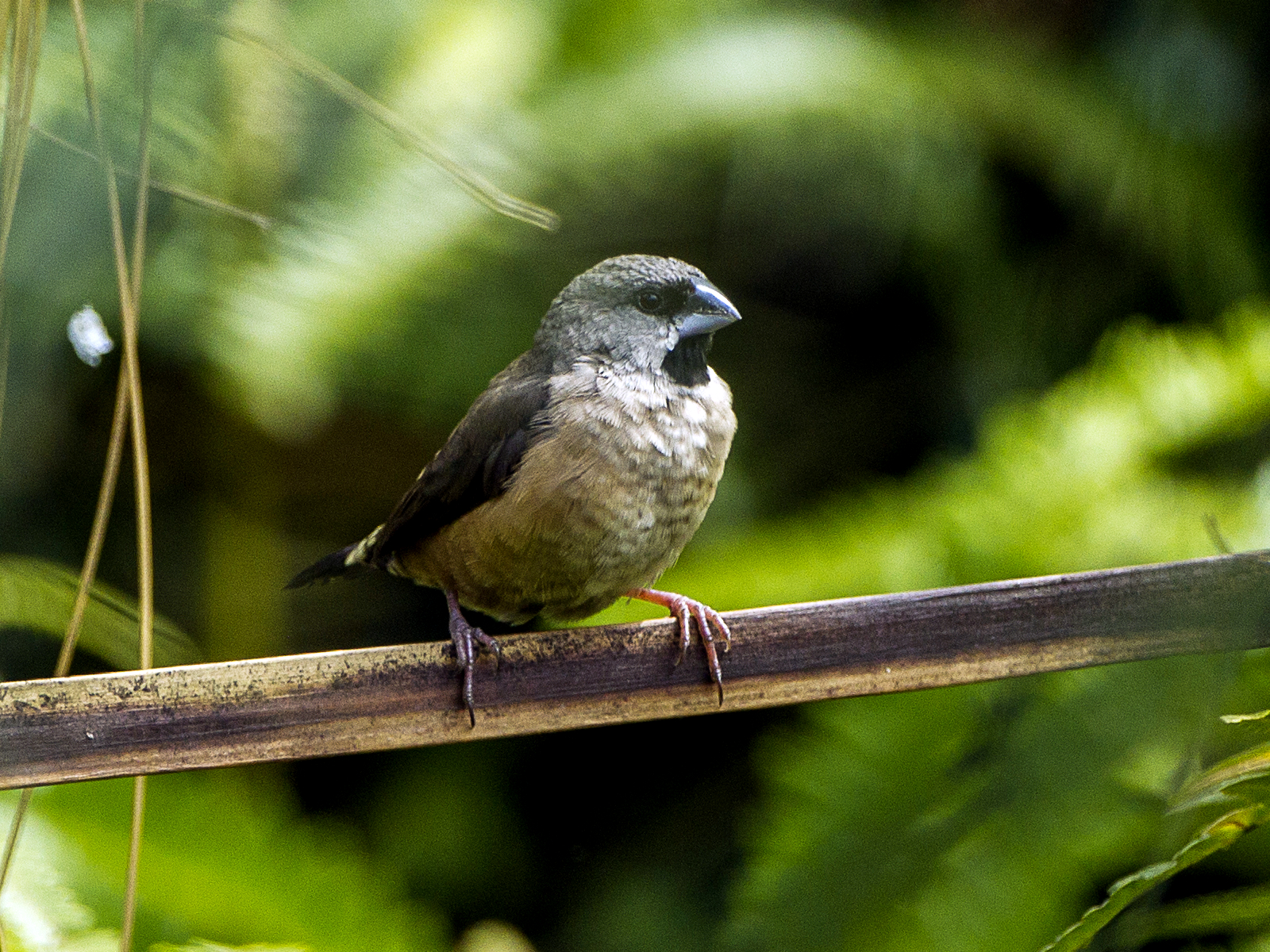

Conservation status
- Least Concern (IUCN 3.1)

Scientific classification
- Kingdom: Animalia
- Phylum: Chordata
- Class: Aves
- Order: Passeriformes
- Family: Estrildidae
- Genus: Lepidopygia; Reichenbach, 1862
- Species: L. nana

Binomial name
- Lepidopygia nana (Pucheran, 1845)

Synonyms
- Lemuresthes nana Lonchura nana

= Madagascar mannikin =

Species of bird

The Madagascar mannikin (Lepidopygia nana) is a common species of estrildid finch native to Madagascar. It has an estimated global extent of occurrence of 100,000 to 1,000,000 km^{2}. Other names for this species include Madagascar munia, bibfinch, African bibfinch, African parsonfinch, and dwarf mannikin.

It is found in subtropical and tropical dry forest, grassland, shrubland and even artificial landscapes. The status of the species is evaluated as Least Concern.
