= Grey-crowned mannikin =

Conservation status
- Least Concern (IUCN 3.1)

Scientific classification
- Kingdom: Animalia
- Phylum: Chordata
- Class: Aves
- Order: Passeriformes
- Family: Estrildidae
- Genus: Lonchura
- Species: L. nevermanni

Binomial name
- Lonchura nevermanni Stresemann, 1934

Species of bird

The grey-crowned mannikin (Lonchura nevermanni), or grey-crowned munia, is a species of estrildid finch of southern New Guinea. It has an estimated global extent of occurrence of 20,000 to 50,000 km^{2}.

It is found in moist savanna & wetlands habitats. The status of the species is evaluated as Least Concern.
