= Eastern alpine mannikin =

Conservation status
- Least Concern (IUCN 3.1)

Scientific classification
- Kingdom: Animalia
- Phylum: Chordata
- Class: Aves
- Order: Passeriformes
- Family: Estrildidae
- Genus: Lonchura
- Species: L. monticola

Binomial name
- Lonchura monticola (De Vis, 1897)

Species of bird

The eastern alpine mannikin (Lonchura monticola) or alpine munia is a species of estrildid finch native to the Papuan Peninsula. It has an estimated global extent of occurrence of 20,000 to 50,000 km^{2}.

It is found in subtropical/ tropical high altitude grassland habitat. The status of the species is evaluated as Least Concern.
