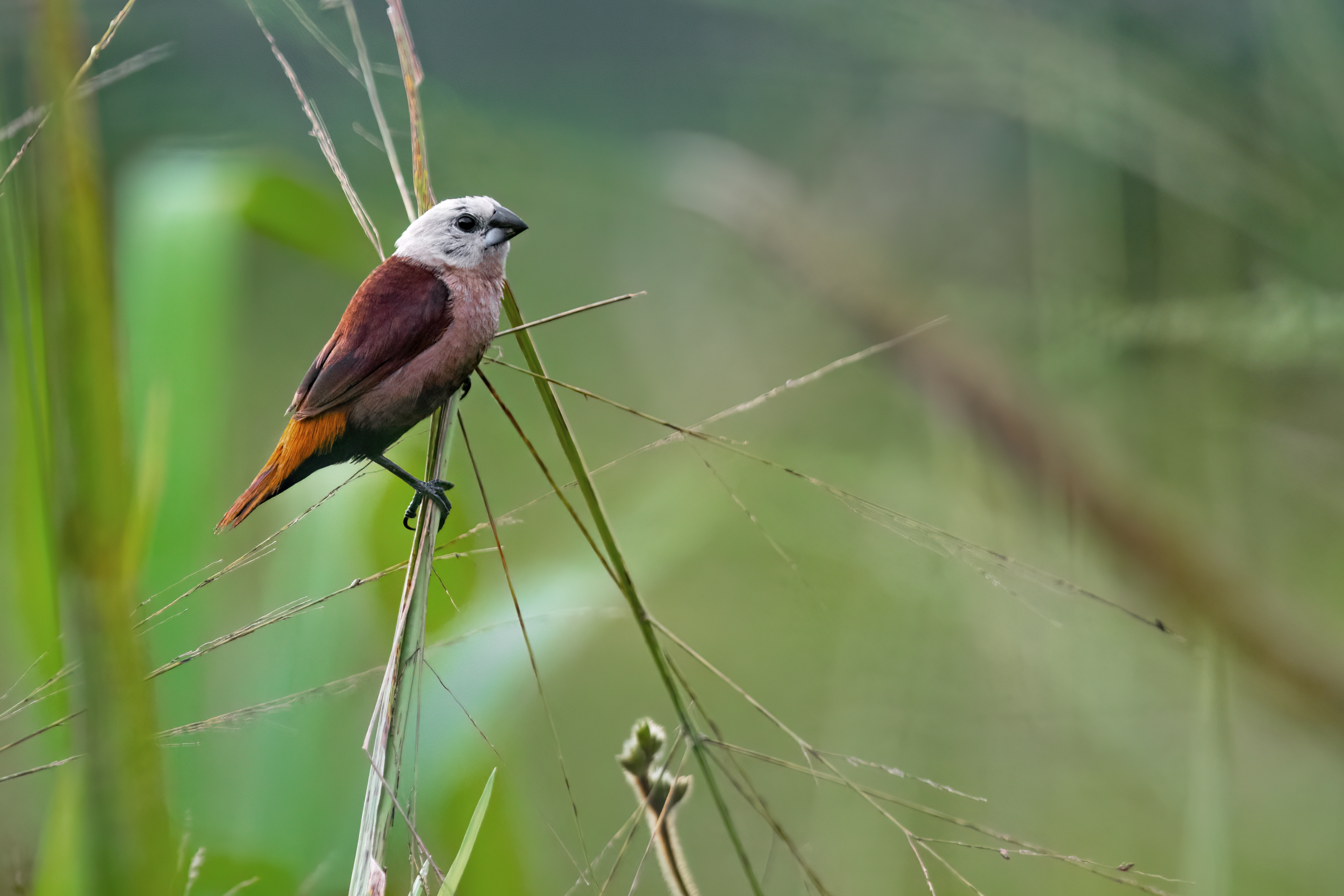

Conservation status
- Least Concern (IUCN 3.1)

Scientific classification
- Kingdom: Animalia
- Phylum: Chordata
- Class: Aves
- Order: Passeriformes
- Family: Estrildidae
- Genus: Lonchura
- Species: L. caniceps

Binomial name
- Lonchura caniceps (Salvadori, 1876)

= Grey-headed mannikin =

Species of bird

The grey-headed mannikin or grey-headed munia (Lonchura caniceps) is a species of estrildid finch, native to the Papuan Peninsula. It has an estimated global extent of occurrence of 50,000 to 100,000 km^{2}. It is found in moist savanna, shrubland & wetlands. The status of the species is evaluated as Least Concern.
