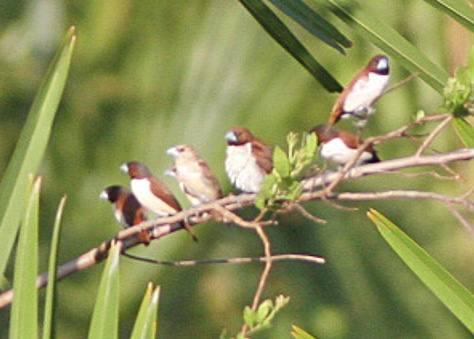

Conservation status
- Least Concern (IUCN 3.1)

Scientific classification
- Kingdom: Animalia
- Phylum: Chordata
- Class: Aves
- Order: Passeriformes
- Family: Estrildidae
- Genus: Lonchura
- Species: L. quinticolor

Binomial name
- Lonchura quinticolor (Vieillot, 1807)

= Five-colored munia =

Species of bird

The five-colored munia (Lonchura quinticolor) is a common species of estrildid finch found in the Lesser Sunda Islands. It inhabits many different habitats even in artificial landscapes, forest, shrubland and wet grassland habitats. The status of the species is evaluated as Least Concern.
