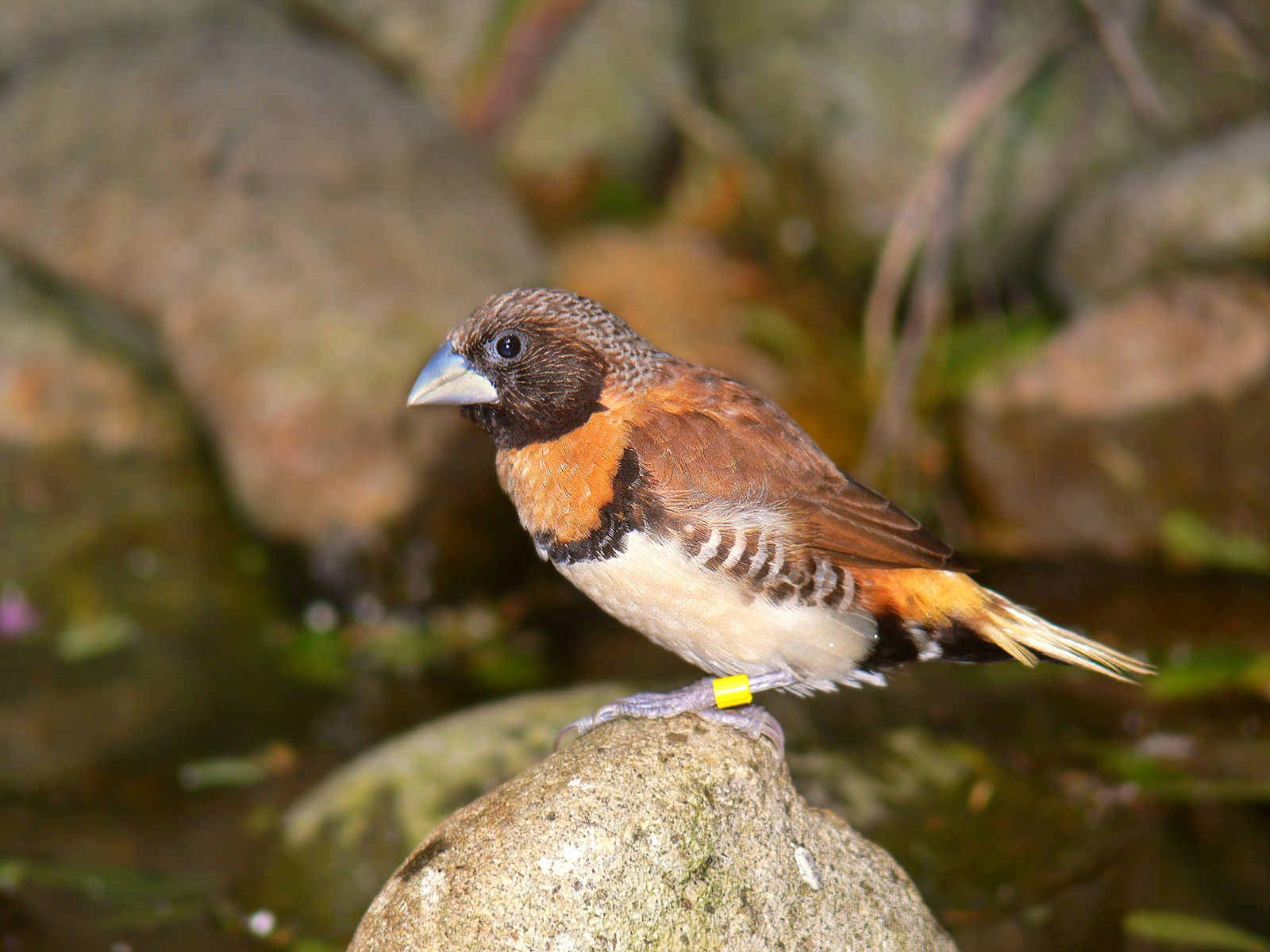
- Chestnut-breasted munia Lonchura castaneothorax

Scientific classification
- Kingdom: Animalia
- Phylum: Chordata
- Class: Aves
- Order: Passeriformes
- Family: Estrildidae
- Genus: Lonchura; Sykes, 1832

Type species
- Fringilla nisoria = Loxia punctulata nisoria Temminck 1830

Species
- See text

= Lonchura =

Genus of birds

Lonchura is a genus of the estrildid finch family, and includes munias (or minias) and mannikins. They are seed-eating birds that are found in South Asia from India, Bangladesh, Sri Lanka east to Indonesia, Papua New Guinea, and the Philippines. The name mannikin is from Middle Dutch mannekijn 'little man', and also the source of the common name of the family Pipridae, manakin.

Some of the Lonchura species were formerly placed in Spermestes. Others have been placed in a genus of their own, Euodice.

== Taxonomy ==
The genus Lonchura was introduced by the English naturalist William Henry Sykes in 1832. The name combines the Ancient Greek lonkhē meaning "spear-head" or "lance" with oura meaning "tail". Sykes included three species in the genus and of these the type species was designated as Fringilla nisoria Temminck 1830 by Arend Wiegmann in 1835. This taxon is now a subspecies, Loxia punctulata nisoria, of the scaly-breasted munia.

== Characteristics ==
They are small gregarious birds which feed mainly on seeds, usually in relatively open habitats, preferring to feed on the ground or on reeds of grasses. Several species have been noted to feed on algae such as Spirogyra.

The nest is a large domed grass structure into which four to ten white eggs are laid. Some species also build communal roosting nests for overnight rest.

The species in this genus are similar in size and structure, with stubby bills, stocky bodies and long tails. Most are 10–12 cm in length. Plumage is usually a combination of browns, black and white, with the sexes similar, but duller and less contrasted for immature birds.

The similarities within this group and the existence of subspecies with differing vocalisations and plumage mean that some races may be elevated to species status. African and Indian silverbill are now usually considered distinct species in the Genus Euodice, and the two races of black-throated munia are often also split.

The munias are popular in the bird trade and many freed or escaped birds have formed feral colonies in different pockets across the world.

The red munia Amandava amandava and green munia Amandava formosa also take the name munia, but are in the genus Amandava.

=== Species ===
28 species are generally recognized in this genus as of 2025:

| Image | Common name | Scientific name | Distribution |
|---|---|---|---|
| | Scaly-breasted munia also known as nutmeg mannikin or spice finch | Lonchura punctulata | Indian Subcontinent, including Pakistan, India, Nepal, Bangladesh and Sri Lanka |
| | Black-throated munia also known as Jerdon's mannikin | Lonchura kelaarti | southwest India, the Eastern Ghats and Sri Lanka |
| | Black-faced munia | Lonchura molucca | Indonesia |
| | White-rumped munia | Lonchura striata | Indian subcontinent to southern China east to Taiwan, and through Southeast Asia south to Sumatra |
| | Dusky munia | Lonchura fuscans | Borneo |
| | White-bellied munia | Lonchura leucogastra | Malay Peninsula to Philippines |
| | Javan munia | Lonchura leucogastroides | Southern Sumatra, Java, Bali and Lombok, Indonesia. Introduced in Singapore and south Malay Peninsula |
| | Tricolored munia | Lonchura malacca | southern India and Sri Lanka |
| | Chestnut munia | Lonchura atricapilla | Bangladesh, Brunei, Cambodia, China, India, Indonesia, Laos, Malaysia, Burma, Nepal, Philippines, Singapore, Taiwan, Thailand, Vietnam and Hawaii |
| | White-capped munia | Lonchura ferruginosa | Java and Bali |
| | White-headed munia | Lonchura maja | Indonesia, Malaysia, Singapore, Thailand and Vietnam |
| | Pale-headed munia | Lonchura pallida | Indonesia |
| | Great-billed mannikin | Lonchura grandis | northern and eastern New Guinea |
| | Black-breasted mannikin | Lonchura teerinki | West Papua, Indonesia |
| | Western alpine mannikin | Lonchura montana | New Guinea |
| | Eastern alpine mannikin | Lonchura monticola | Papua |
| | Grey-banded mannikin | Lonchura vana | north-west Papua, Indonesia |
| | Grey-crowned mannikin | Lonchura nevermanni | southern New Guinea |
| | Grey-headed mannikin | Lonchura caniceps | Papua |
| | Hooded mannikin | Lonchura spectabilis | New Britain and New Guinea |
| | Forbes's mannikin | Lonchura forbesi | Papua New Guinea |
| | Mottled mannikin | Lonchura hunsteini | New Ireland |
| | New Hanover mannikin | Lonchura nigerrima | New Hannover |
| | Yellow-rumped mannikin | Lonchura flaviprymna | Northern Territory, Australia |
| | Five-colored munia | Lonchura quinticolor | Lesser Sunda Islands |
| | Chestnut-breasted mannikin | Lonchura castaneothorax | Australia, New Caledonia, Indonesia, and Papua New Guinea. |
| | Black mannikin | Lonchura stygia | New Guinea, Papua, Papua New Guinea |
| | Buff-bellied mannikin | Lonchura melaena | New Britain and Buka Island |

The cream-bellied munia or cream-bellied mannikin (L. "pallidiventer") is a supposed species from Borneo. It is today generally considered a hybrid between either white-capped and five-coloured, or between white-bellied and scaly-breasted munias; in the former case, the parents would have been feral escapees from the cage-bird trade. Alternatively, the supposed "species" might have been entirely captive-bred and never occurred in the wild.
