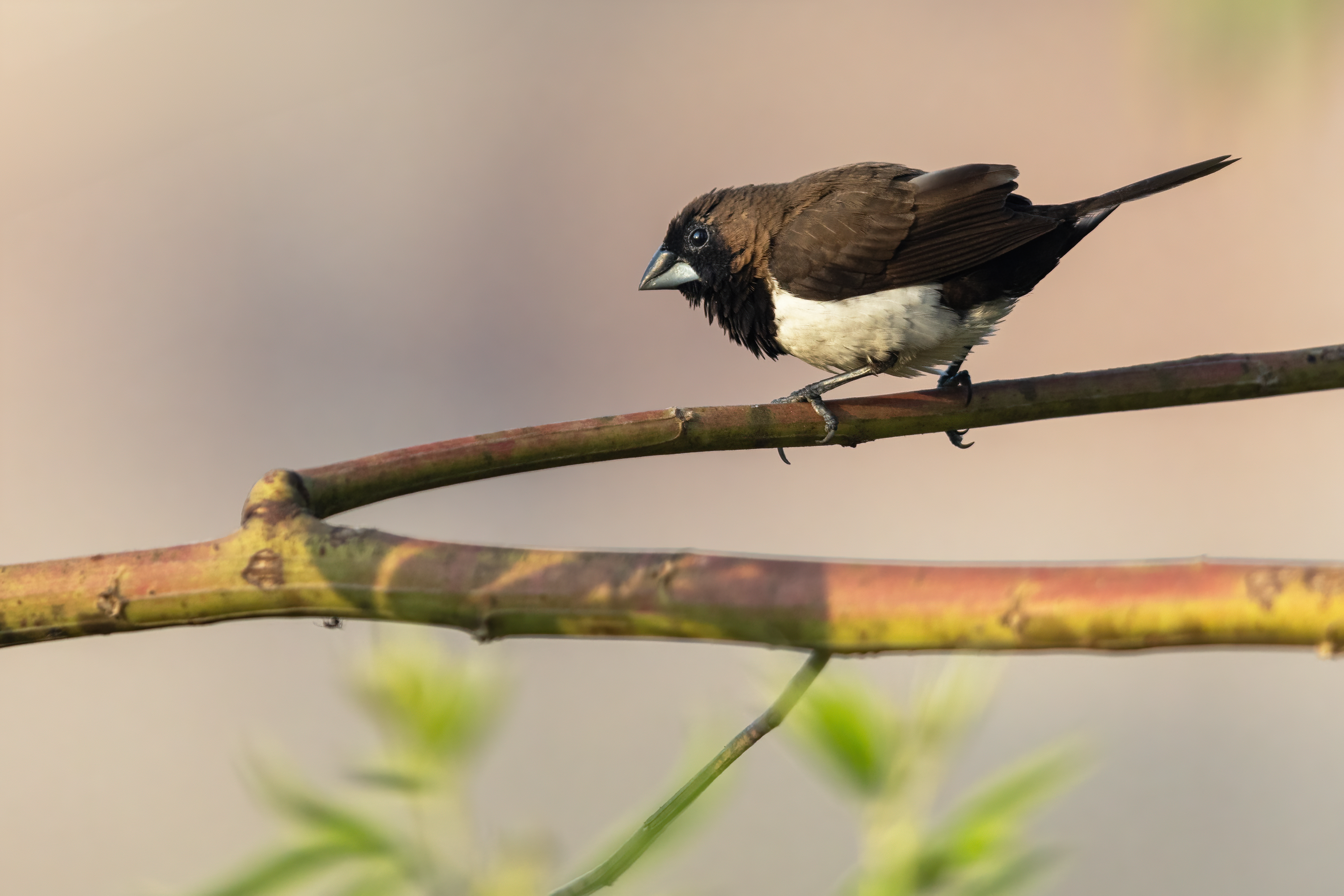
- Javan munia in Malang

Conservation status
- Least Concern (IUCN 3.1)

Scientific classification
- Kingdom: Animalia
- Phylum: Chordata
- Class: Aves
- Order: Passeriformes
- Family: Estrildidae
- Genus: Lonchura
- Species: L. leucogastroides

Binomial name
- Lonchura leucogastroides (Moore, F, 1858)

= Javan munia =

Species of bird

The Javan munia (Lonchura leucogastroides) is a species of estrildid finch native to southern Sumatra, Java, Bali and Lombok islands in Indonesia. It was introduced in Singapore and the Malay Peninsula; It inhabits subtropical and tropical dry shrubland and grassland habitat. It has been assessed as Least Concern on the IUCN Red List.

The Javan munia is known to feed on algae.
