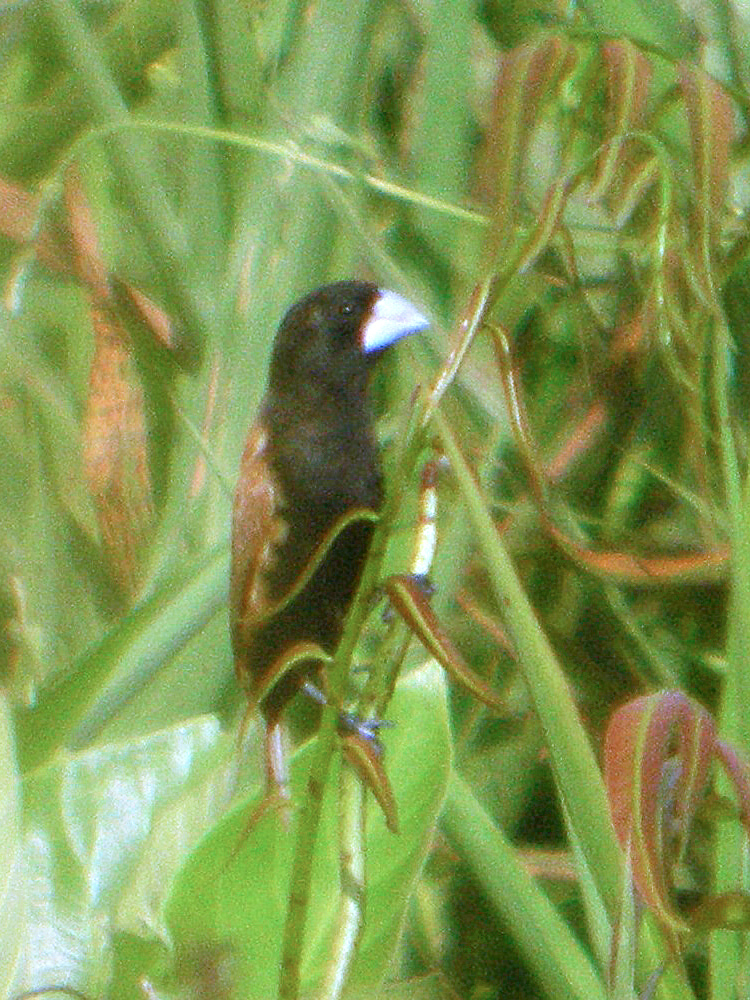

Conservation status
- Least Concern (IUCN 3.1)

Scientific classification
- Kingdom: Animalia
- Phylum: Chordata
- Class: Aves
- Order: Passeriformes
- Family: Estrildidae
- Genus: Lonchura
- Species: L. grandis

Binomial name
- Lonchura grandis (Sharpe, 1882)

= Great-billed mannikin =

Species of bird

The great-billed mannikin or grand munia (Lonchura grandis) is a species of estrildid finch found in northern and eastern New Guinea. It is found in wetlands habitat. The status of the species is evaluated as Least Concern.
