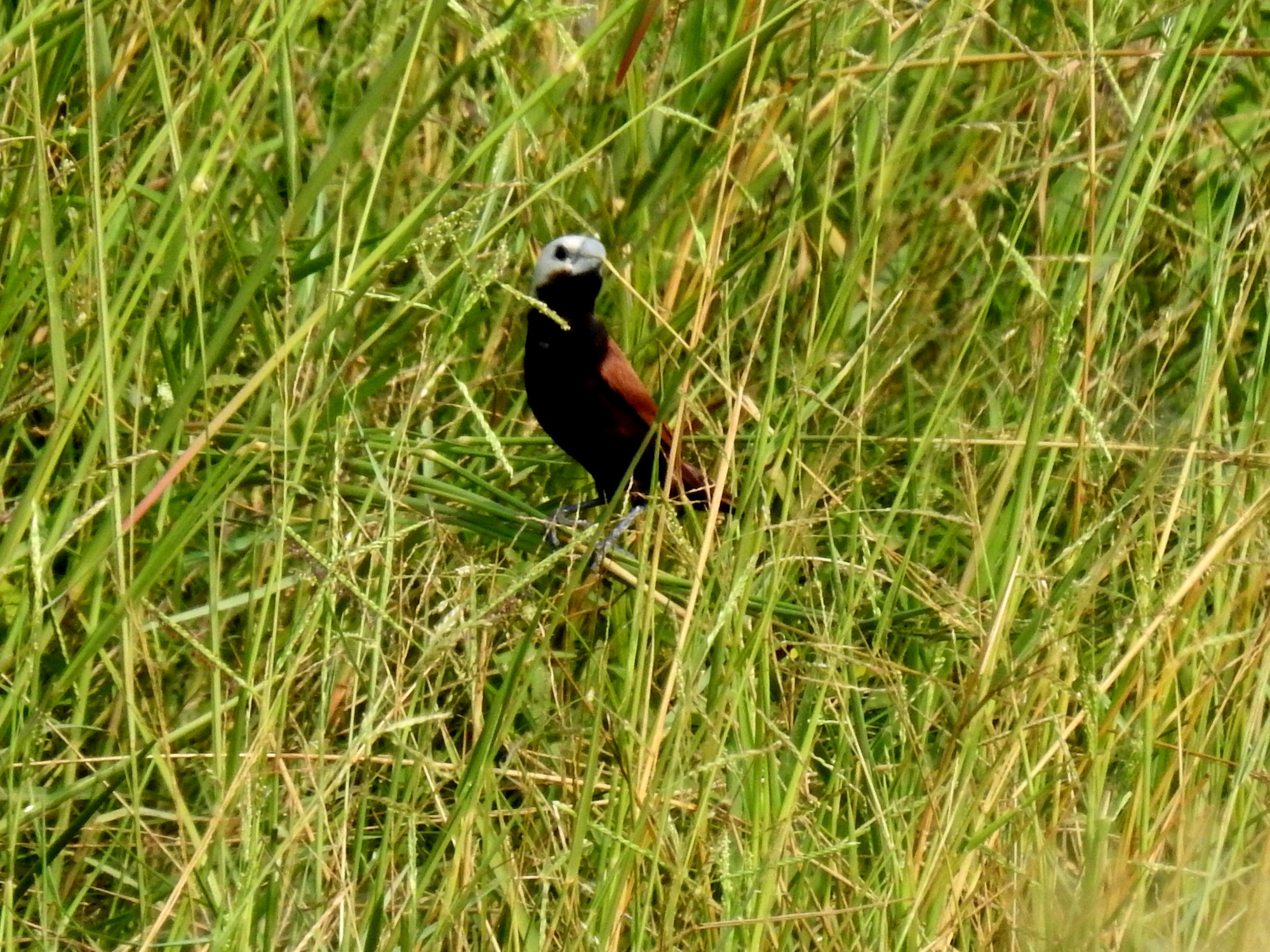

Conservation status
- Least Concern (IUCN 3.1)

Scientific classification
- Kingdom: Animalia
- Phylum: Chordata
- Class: Aves
- Order: Passeriformes
- Family: Estrildidae
- Genus: Lonchura
- Species: L. ferruginosa

Binomial name
- Lonchura ferruginosa (Sparrman, 1789)

= White-capped munia =

Species of bird

The white-capped munia (Lonchura ferruginosa) is a species of estrildid finch found in Java and Bali. It is found in marshes, swamps, fens, grasslands habitat. The status of the species is evaluated as Least Concern.
