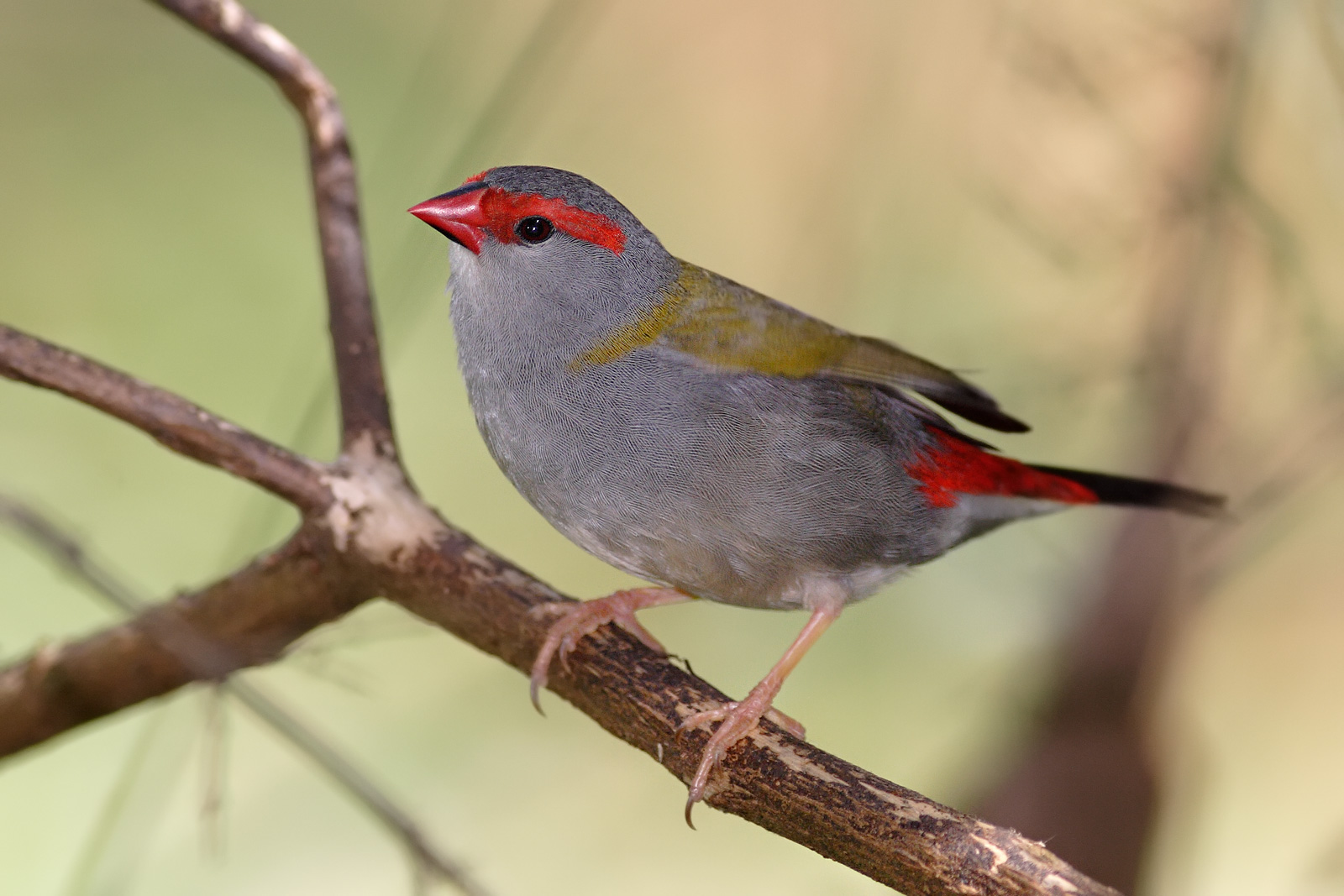
- Red-browed finch, Neochmia temporalis

Scientific classification
- Kingdom: Animalia
- Phylum: Chordata
- Class: Aves
- Order: Passeriformes
- Superfamily: Ploceoidea
- Family: Estrildidae; Bonaparte, 1850

Genera
- See text

= Estrildidae =

Family of birds

Estrildidae, or estrildid finches, is a family of small seed-eating passerine birds of the Old World tropics and Australasia. They comprise species commonly known as munias, mannikins, firefinches, parrotfinches and waxbills.

They are gregarious and often colonial seed eaters with short, thick, but pointed bills. They are all similar in structure and habits, but vary widely in plumage colours and patterns.

All estrildids build large, domed nests and lay five to ten white eggs. Many species build roost nests. Some of the firefinches and pytilias are hosts to the brood-parasitic indigobirds and whydahs, respectively.

Most are sensitive to cold and require warm, usually tropical, habitats, although a few, such as the eastern alpine mannikin, mountain firetail, red-browed finch, and the genus Stagonopleura, have adapted to the cooler climates of southern Australia and the highlands of New Guinea.

The smallest species of the family is the Shelley's oliveback (Nesocharis shelleyi) at a mere 8.3 cm (3.3 in), although the lightest species is the black-rumped waxbill (Estrilda troglodytes) at 6 g (0.21 oz). The largest species is the Java sparrow (Padda oryzivora) at 17 cm (6.7 in) and 25 g (0.88 oz).

== Taxonomy ==
The family Estrildidae was introduced in 1850 by the French naturalist Charles Lucien Bonaparte as "Estreldinae", a spelling variant of the subfamily name. In the list of world birds maintained by AviList the family contains 138 species divided into 39 genera. Molecular phylogenetic studies have shown the family Estrildidae is sister to the family Viduidae containing the indigobirds and whydahs. The two families diverged around 15.5 million year ago. The most recent common ancestor of the Estrildidae is estimated to have lived around 10.9 million years ago. A genetic study of the Estrildidae by Urban Olsson and Per Alström published in 2020 identified 6 major clades. The radiations within these clades occurred between 4.5 and 8.9 million years ago. The authors proposed that each of these clades should be treated as a subfamily. This contrasts with an earlier proposal in which the family was divided into three subfamilies. The following cladogram is based on a study of the Estrildidae by Urban Olsson and Per Alström published in 2020. The locust finch in the genus Paludipasser was not included in the study.

- Estrildidae
  - - - Poephilinae
        - Heteromunia – pictorella mannikin
        - - Oreostruthus – mountain firetail
          - - Stagonopleura – firetails (3 species)
            - - Neochmia – finches (2 species)
              - - Emblema – finches (3 species)
                - - Stizoptera – double-barred finch
                  - - Taeniopygia – zebra finch
                    - Poephila – finches (3 species)
      - Lonchurinae
        - Spermestes – mannikins, silverbill (4 species)
        - - Lepidopygia – Madagascar mannikin
          - - Euodice – silverbills (2 species)
            - - - Padda – sparrows (2 species)
                - Mayrimunia – streak-headed mannikin
              - Lonchura – munias, mannikins (28 species)
    - - Erythrurinae
        - Chloebia – Gouldian finch
        - Erythrura – parrotfinches (12 species)
      - - Estrildinae
          - - - Nesocharis – olivebacks (2 species)
              - Coccopygia – waxbills (3 species)
            - - Mandingoa – green twinspot
              - Cryptospiza – crimsonwings (4 species)
          - - - Parmoptila – antpeckers (3 species)
              - Nigrita – nigritas (4 species)
            - - - Delacourella – grey-headed oliveback
                - - Brunhilda – waxbills (2 species)
                  - Glaucestrilda – waxbills (3 species)
              - Estrilda – waxbills (11 species)
        - - Amandavinae
            - Ortygospiza – quailfinch
            - - Amadina – finches (2 species)
              - Amandava – avadavats, waxbill (3 species)
          - Lagonostictinae
            - - - Granatina – grenadier, waxbill (2 species)
                - Uraeginthus – cordon-bleus, waxbill (3 species)
              - - Spermophaga – bluebills (3 species)
                - Pyrenestes – seedcrackers (3 species)
            - - Pytilia – pytilias (5 species)
              - - - Euschistospiza – twinspots (2 species)
                  - Hypargos – twinspots (2 species)
                - - Clytospiza – brown twinspot
                  - Lagonosticta – firefinches (10 species)

=== Genera list ===
Image	Genus	Living species
	Heteromunia Mathews, 1913	Pictorella mannikin, Heteromunia pectoralis
	Oreostruthus De Vis, 1898	Mountain firetail, Oreostruthus fuliginosus
	Stagonopleura Reichenbach, 1850	Beautiful firetail, Stagonopleura bella; Red-eared firetail, Stagonopleura oculata; Diamond firetail, Stagonopleura guttata
	Neochmia Gray, GR, 1849	Red-browed finch, Neochmia temporalis; Crimson finch, Neochmia phaeton
	Emblema Gould, 1842	Painted finch, Emblema pictum; Star finch, Emblema ruficauda; Plum-headed finch, Emblema modesta
	Stizoptera Oberholser, 1899	Double-barred finch, Stizoptera bichenovii
	Taeniopygia Reichenbach, 1862	Sunda zebra finch, Taeniopygia guttata; Australian zebra finch, Taeniopygia castanotis
	Poephila Gould, 1842	Masked finch, Poephila personata; Long-tailed finch, Poephila acuticauda; Black-throated finch, Poephila cincta
	Spermestes Swainson, 1837	Grey-headed silverbill, Spermestes griseicapilla; Bronze mannikin, Spermestes cucullata, also known as bronze munia; Magpie mannikin, Spermestes fringilloides, also known as magpie munia; Black-and-white mannikin, Spermestes bicolor, also known as black-and-white munia
	Lepidopygia Reichenbach, 1862	Madagascar mannikin, Lepidopygia nana
	Euodice Reichenbach, 1862	African silverbill, Euodice cantans; Indian silverbill, Euodice malabarica also known as white-throated munia
	Padda Reichenbach, 1850	Java sparrow, Padda oryzivora; Timor sparrow, Padda fuscata
	Mayrimunia Wolters, 1949	Streak-headed mannikin, Mayrimunia tristissima; White-spotted mannikin, Mayrimunia cinereovinacea
	Lonchura Sykes, 1832	Scaly-breasted munia, Lonchura punctulata, also known as nutmeg mannikin or spice finch; Black-throated munia, Lonchura kelaarti, also known as Jerdon's mannikin; Black-faced munia, Lonchura molucca; White-rumped munia, Lonchura striata; Dusky munia, Lonchura fuscans; White-bellied munia, Lonchura leucogastra; New Hanover mannikin, Lonchura nigerrima; Tricolored munia, Lonchura malacca; Chestnut munia, Lonchura atricapilla; White-capped munia, Lonchura ferruginosa; White-headed munia, Lonchura maja; Pale-headed munia, Lonchura pallida; Great-billed mannikin, Lonchura grandis; Black-breasted mannikin, Lonchura teerinki; Western alpine mannikin, Lonchura montana; Eastern alpine mannikin, Lonchura monticola; Grey-banded mannikin, Lonchura vana; Grey-crowned mannikin, Lonchura nevermanni; Hooded mannikin, Lonchura spectabilis; Mottled mannikin, Lonchura hunsteini; New Hanover mannikin, Lonchura nigerrima; Forbes's mannikin, Lonchura forbesi; Javan munia, Lonchura leucogastroides; Yellow-rumped mannikin, Lonchura flaviprymna; Five-colored munia, Lonchura quinticolor; Chestnut-breasted mannikin, Lonchura castaneothorax; Black mannikin, Lonchura stygia; Buff-bellied mannikin, Lonchura melaena
	Chloebia Reichenbach, 1862	Gouldian finch, Chloebia gouldiae
	Erythrura Swainson, 1837	Tawny-breasted parrotfinch, Erythrura hyperythra; Pin-tailed parrotfinch, Erythrura prasina; Green-faced parrotfinch, Erythrura viridifacies; Tricolored parrotfinch, Erythrura tricolor; Blue-faced parrotfinch, Erythrura trichroa; Red-eared parrotfinch, Erythrura coloria; Papuan parrotfinch, Erythrura papuana; Red-throated parrotfinch, Erythrura psittacea; Fiji parrotfinch, Erythrura pealii; Red-headed parrotfinch, Erythrura cyaneovirens; Royal parrotfinch, Erythrura regia; Pink-billed parrotfinch, Erythrura kleinschmidti
	Nesocharis Alexander, 1903	White-collared oliveback, Nesocharis ansorgei; Shelley's oliveback, Nesocharis shelleyi
	Coccopygia Reichenbach, 1862	Yellow-bellied waxbill, Coccopygia quartinia; Swee waxbill, Coccopygia melanotis; Angola waxbill, Coccopygia bocagei
	Mandingoa Hartert, E, 1919	Green-backed twinspot, Mandingoa nitidula
	Cryptospiza Salvadori, 1884	Red-faced crimsonwing, Cryptospiza reichenovii; Abyssinian crimsonwing, Cryptospiza salvadorii; Dusky crimsonwing, Cryptospiza jacksoni; Shelley's crimsonwing, Cryptospiza shelleyi
	Parmoptila Cassin, 1859	Red-fronted antpecker, Parmoptila rubrifrons; Jameson's antpecker, Parmoptila jamesoni – often included in P. rubrifrons; Woodhouse's antpecker, Parmoptila woodhousei
	Nigrita Strickland, 1843	White-breasted nigrita, Nigrita fusconotus; Chestnut-breasted nigrita, Nigrita bicolor; Pale-fronted nigrita, Nigrita luteifrons; Grey-headed nigrita, Nigrita canicapillus
	Delacourella Wolters, 1949	Grey-headed oliveback, Delacourella capistrata
	Brunhilda Reichenbach, 1862	Black-faced waxbill, Brunhilda erythronotos; Black-cheeked waxbill, Brunhilda charmosyna
	Glaucestrilda Roberts, 1922	Lavender waxbill, Glaucestrilda caerulescens; Grey waxbill, Glaucestrilda perreini; Cinderella waxbill, Glaucestrilda thomensis
	Estrilda Swainson, 1827	Black-crowned waxbill, Estrilda nonnula; Black-headed waxbill, Estrilda atricapilla; Kandt's waxbill, Estrilda kandti; Orange-cheeked waxbill, Estrilda melpoda; Anambra waxbill, Estrilda poliopareia; Fawn-breasted waxbill, Estrilda paludicola; Common waxbill, Estrilda astrild; Black-lored waxbill, Estrilda nigriloris; Black-rumped waxbill, Estrilda troglodytes; Crimson-rumped waxbill, Estrilda rhodopyga; Arabian waxbill, Estrilda rufibarba
	Ortygospiza Sundevall, 1850	Quailfinch, Ortygospiza atricollis
	Paludipasser Neave, 1909	Locust finch, Paludipasser locustella
	Amadina Swainson, 1827	Cut-throat finch, Amadina fasciata; Red-headed finch, Amadina erythrocephala
	Amandava Blyth, 1836	Red avadavat, Amandava amandava also known as red munia; Green avadavat, Amandava formosa; Orange-breasted waxbill, Amandava subflava
	Granatina Sharpe, 1890	Purple grenadier, Granatina ianthinogaster; Violet-eared waxbill, Granatina granatina
	Uraeginthus Cabanis, 1851	Blue waxbill, Uraeginthus angolensis; Red-cheeked cordon-bleu, Uraeginthus bengalus; Blue-capped cordon-bleu, Uraeginthus cyanocephalus
	Spermophaga Swainson, 1837	Grant's bluebill, Spermophaga poliogenys; Western bluebill, Spermophaga haematina; Red-headed bluebill, Spermophaga ruficapilla
	Pyrenestes Swainson, 1837	Crimson seedcracker, Pyrenestes sanguineus; Black-bellied seedcracker, Pyrenestes ostrinus; Lesser seedcracker, Pyrenestes minor
	Pytilia Swainson, 1837	Orange-winged pytilia, Pytilia afra; Red-winged pytilia, Pytilia phoenicoptera; Red-billed pytilia, Pytilia lineata; Green-winged pytilia, Pytilia melba; Yellow-winged pytilia, Pytilia hypogrammica
	Euschistospiza Wolters, 1943	Dybowski's twinspot, Euschistospiza dybowskii; Dusky twinspot, Euschistospiza cinereovinacea
	Hypargos Reichenbach, 1862	Red-throated twinspot, Hypargos niveoguttatus; Pink-throated twinspot, Hypargos margaritatus
	Clytospiza Shelley, 1896	Brown twinspot, Clytospiza monteiri
	Lagonosticta Cabanis, 1851	Bar-breasted firefinch, Lagonosticta rufopicta; Brown firefinch, Lagonosticta nitidula; Red-billed firefinch, Lagonosticta senegala; Black-bellied firefinch, Lagonosticta rara; African firefinch, Lagonosticta rubricata; Jameson's firefinch, Lagonosticta rhodopareia; Mali firefinch, Lagonosticta virata; Rock firefinch, Lagonosticta sanguinodorsalis; Black-faced firefinch, Lagonosticta larvata; Chad firefinch, Lagonosticta umbrinodorsalis
