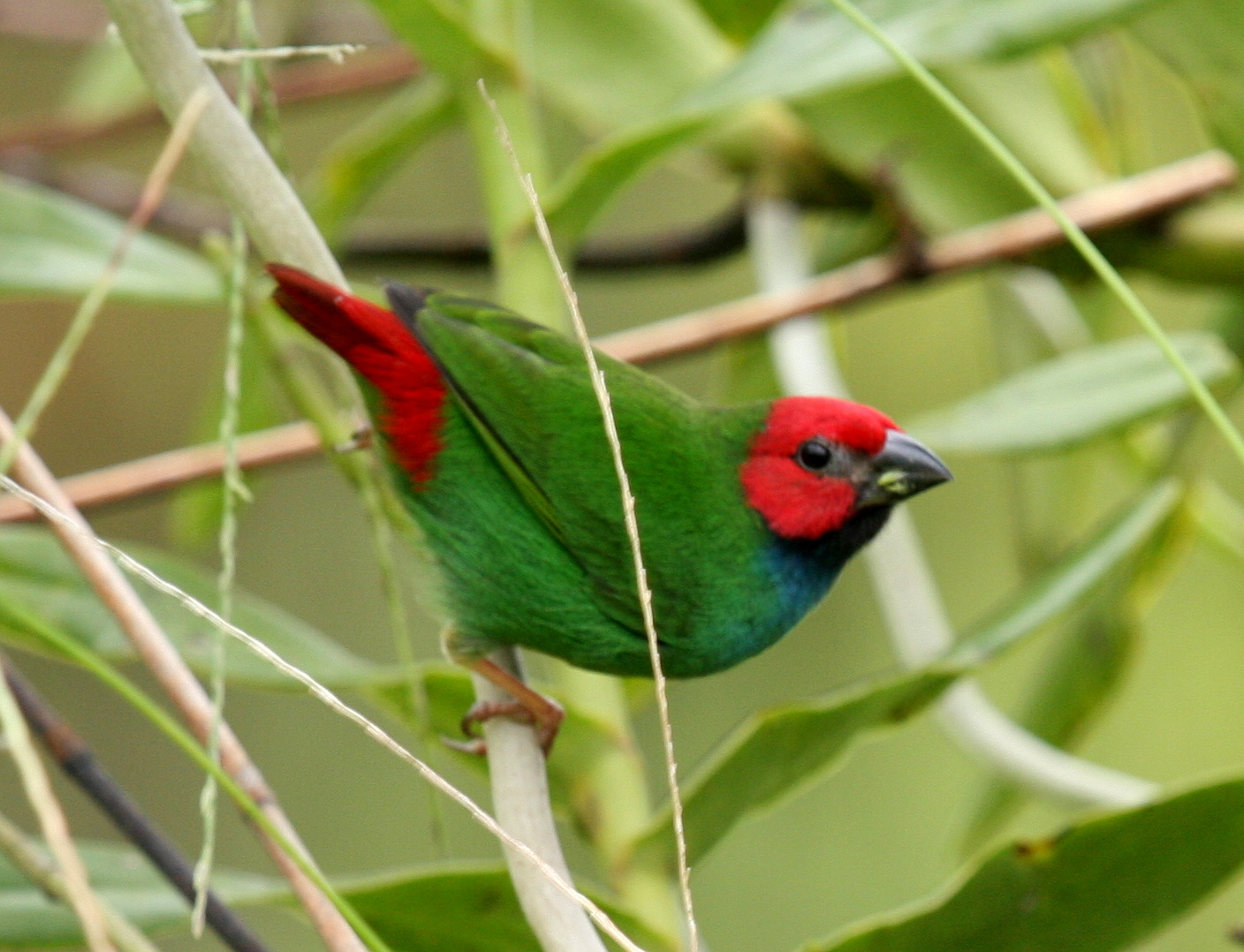
- Adult

Conservation status
- Least Concern (IUCN 3.1)

Scientific classification
- Kingdom: Animalia
- Phylum: Chordata
- Class: Aves
- Order: Passeriformes
- Family: Estrildidae
- Genus: Erythrura
- Species: E. pealii

Binomial name
- Erythrura pealii Hartlaub, 1852
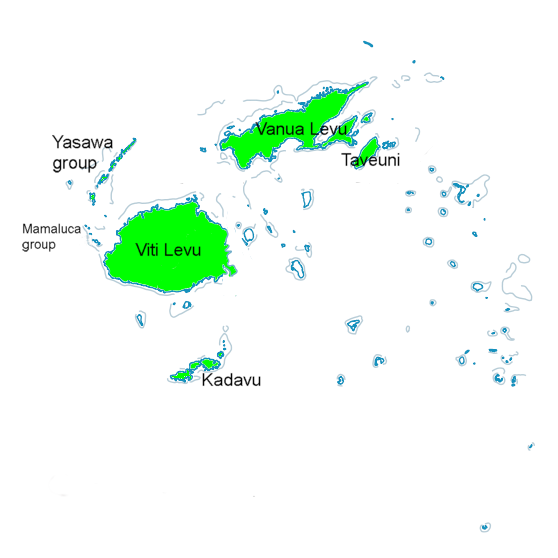
- = resident year-round Pale blue lines (mostly around islands) = coral reefs

Synonyms
- Geospiza prasina

= Fiji parrotfinch =

Species of bird in the family Estreldidae

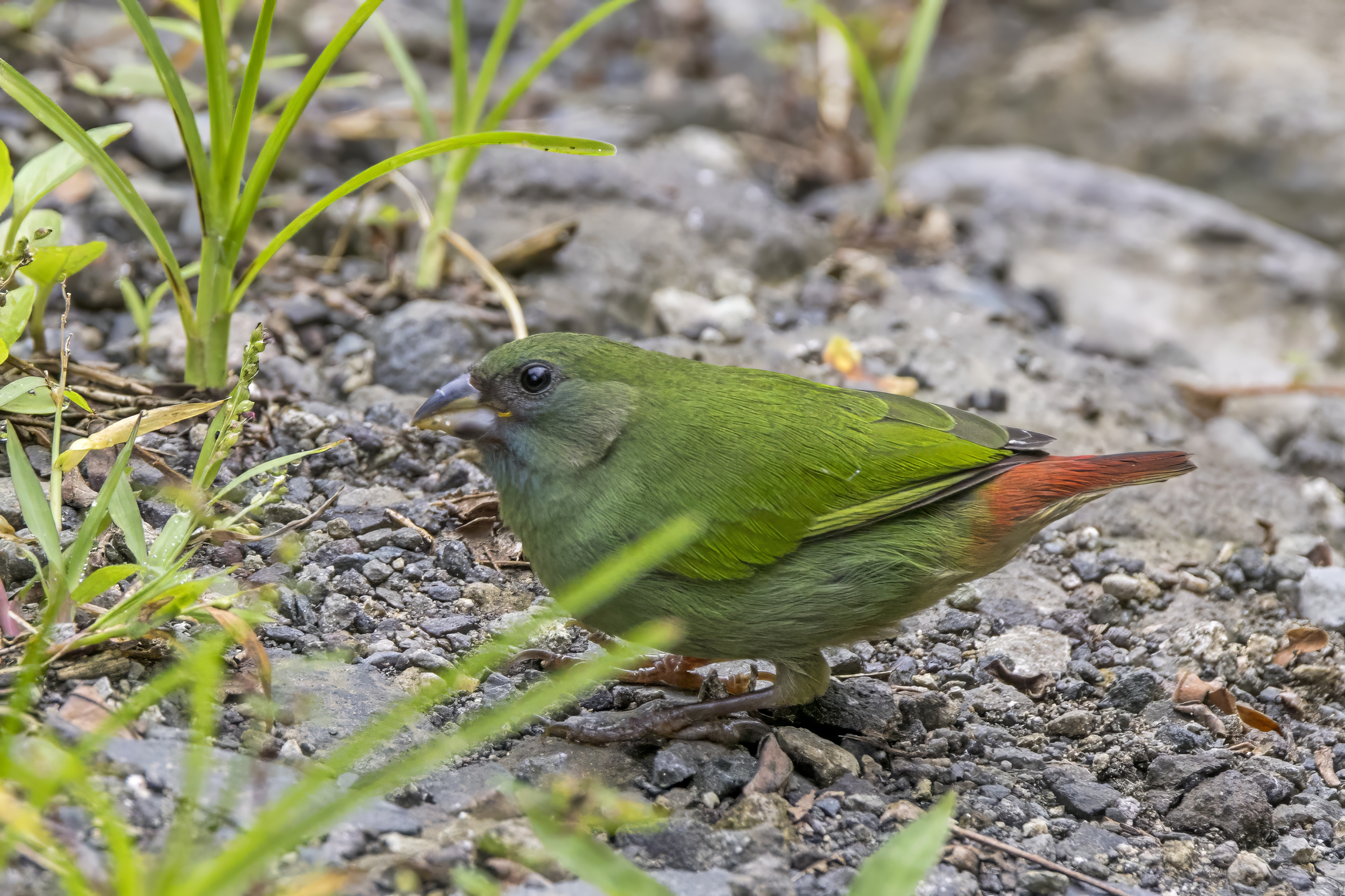
juvenile

The Fiji parrotfinch (Erythrura pealii) is a species of estrildid finch endemic to Fiji that was formerly considered to be a subspecies of the red-headed parrotfinch. This parrotfinch is a small, mainly green bird with a red head and tail and a stubby dark grey bill. It is found in both forested and open habitats, and has adapted well to man-made environments such as grasslands, pasture and gardens. Pairs have a courtship display in which they fly above the trees in an undulating flight, calling constantly. Breeding birds build a domed grass nest with a side entrance, and lay a clutch normally of four white eggs. Newly hatched chicks are naked and pink, with blue balls at the upper and lower corners of the gape, and black markings inside the mouth; older fledglings resemble the adults, but lack the red head colouring. The Fiji parrotfinch eats seeds, especially of grasses, and also readily feeds on insects and nectar. It forms small flocks of up to six birds after the breeding season.

Parrotfinches may be preyed upon by indigenous birds of prey such as the endemic Fiji goshawk, or by introduced mammals such as the small Asian mongoose, rats, and mice, and they may be susceptible to disease. The Fiji species, despite being both uncommon and endemic to one island group, appears to be stable in numbers. It is therefore classified as Least Concern on the IUCN Red List, and it is protected under Fijian law.

== Taxonomy ==
The parrotfinches are a genus of estrildid finches found in Southeast Asia and Australasia. They are small birds with short rounded wings and tails. Most species have green bodies, and all but one have the red tail that gives the genus its scientific name Erythrura, which is derived from the Ancient Greek ερυθρός erythros, "red", and ουρά oura, "tail". The English name of Fijian Fire-tail Finch was used in early writings.

The Fiji parrotfinch was initially described by American naturalist and entomologist Titian Peale. As chief naturalist for the United States Exploring Expedition of 1838–1842 led by Charles Wilkes, Peale collected and preserved many specimens, including the red-throated parrotfinch from Samoa and the Fiji parrotfinch from Vanua Levu. Peale named the latter species as Geospiza prasina. Peale's birds were reviewed by German physician and ornithologist Gustav Hartlaub. Hartlaub moved the Fiji species to the genus Erythrura, and then had to change the specific name, since another bird, the pin-tailed parrotfinch already had the binomial E. prasina. He renamed the Fiji bird as E. pealii in honour of its finder. The Fijian common names kulakula and qiqikula are derived from "kula", red.

The Fiji parrotfinch and the royal parrotfinch of northern Vanuatu are now again usually considered to be distinct species, but they were formerly frequently treated as subspecies of the Samoan red-headed parrotfinch, E. cyaneovirens.

== Description ==
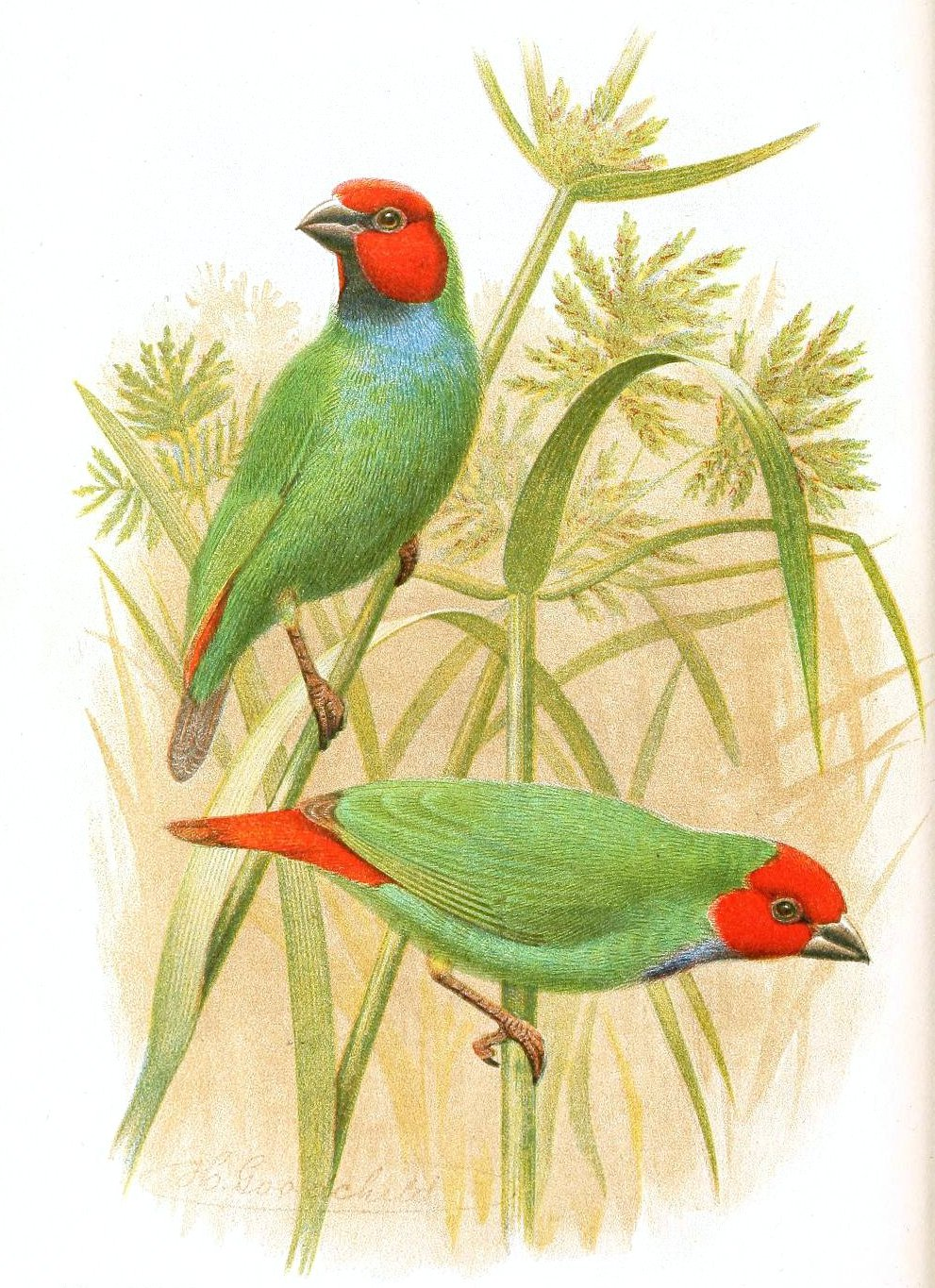

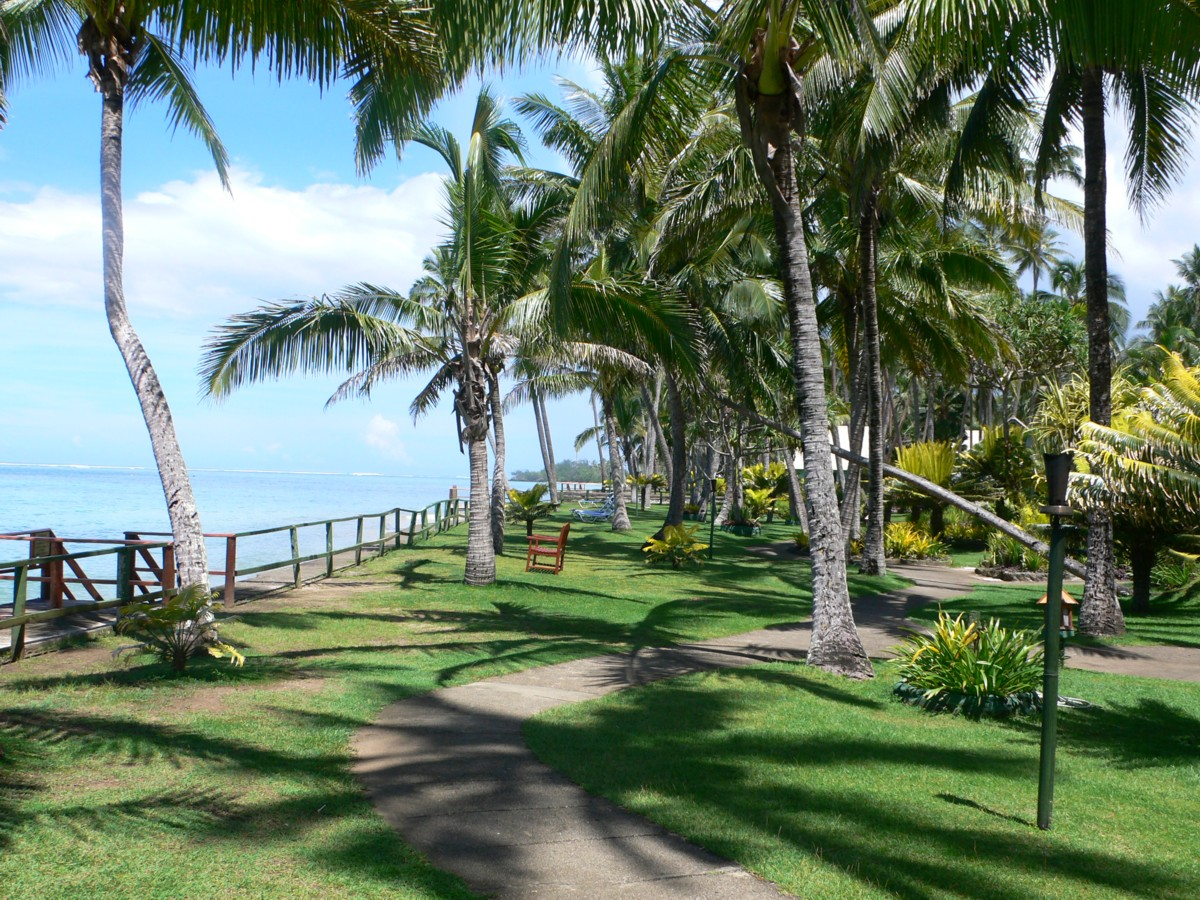
The use of carpet grass for lawns has helped the Fiji parrotfinch to use human-modified habitats like gardens.

The Fiji parrotfinch is a small finch, 10 cm (4 in) in length. The adult male has a bright green body and wings, red head, and scarlet rump and tail. The blackish feathering of the chin becomes dark blue on the lower throat and turquoise on the upper breast before fading into the green of the underparts. The stubby bill is blackish-grey, the eyes are reddish-brown and the legs and feet are pinkish-brown. The female is very similar to the male, but possibly slightly duller and with paler flanks. Young birds have a dark-tipped yellow bill and sometimes a bluish face which gradually turns red, but the rest of the plumage is like the adult. Full mature plumage is achieved at about 20 months. Some rare individuals of this parrotfinch have the entire head and face blue, apparently due to a natural mutation.

The flight of the Fiji parrotfinch is fast and undulating with rapid wingbeats, and frequent calling. It tends to fly fairly high, landing in the tree tops, then descending to seek food. Its call is a high, thin seep or peep, similar to those of other parrotfinches such as blue-faced and red-throated, and is often repeated in bursts of varying length. The song is a long whistled double note similar to, but less urgent, than that of the orange-breasted myzomela, a Fijian endemic honeyeater.

Fiji has another Erythrura species, the rare and endangered pink-billed parrotfinch. This is a larger bird with a green head, blue crown and black face, and a very large pink bill. The Fiji parrotfinch resembles the closely related royal and red-headed parrotfinches, and the rare blue-headed variant is very like the blue-faced parrotfinch, but these three species do not occur in Fiji.

== Distribution and habitat ==
The Fiji parrotfinch is endemic to Fiji, where it is found on the four largest islands (Viti Levu, Vanua Levu, Taveuni and Kadavu) and also in the smaller western islands of the Mamanuca and the Yasawa groups. It is uncommon but widespread, found in both forested and open habitats, from sea level to at least 1,200 m (3,900 ft) on Viti Levu. It appears to be less common on Taveuni than the larger islands. It has adapted well to man-made habitats, and is seen in grasslands, pasture, rice paddies, parks and gardens. Many parrotfinch species are mainly forest birds, but American ornithologist Jared Diamond has suggested that in the central Pacific, where there are no seed-eating munias occupying the open habitats, species such as Vanuatu's blue-faced parrotfinch and its Fijian relative have expanded into grassy areas of their islands to exploit the supply of seeds.

== Behaviour ==
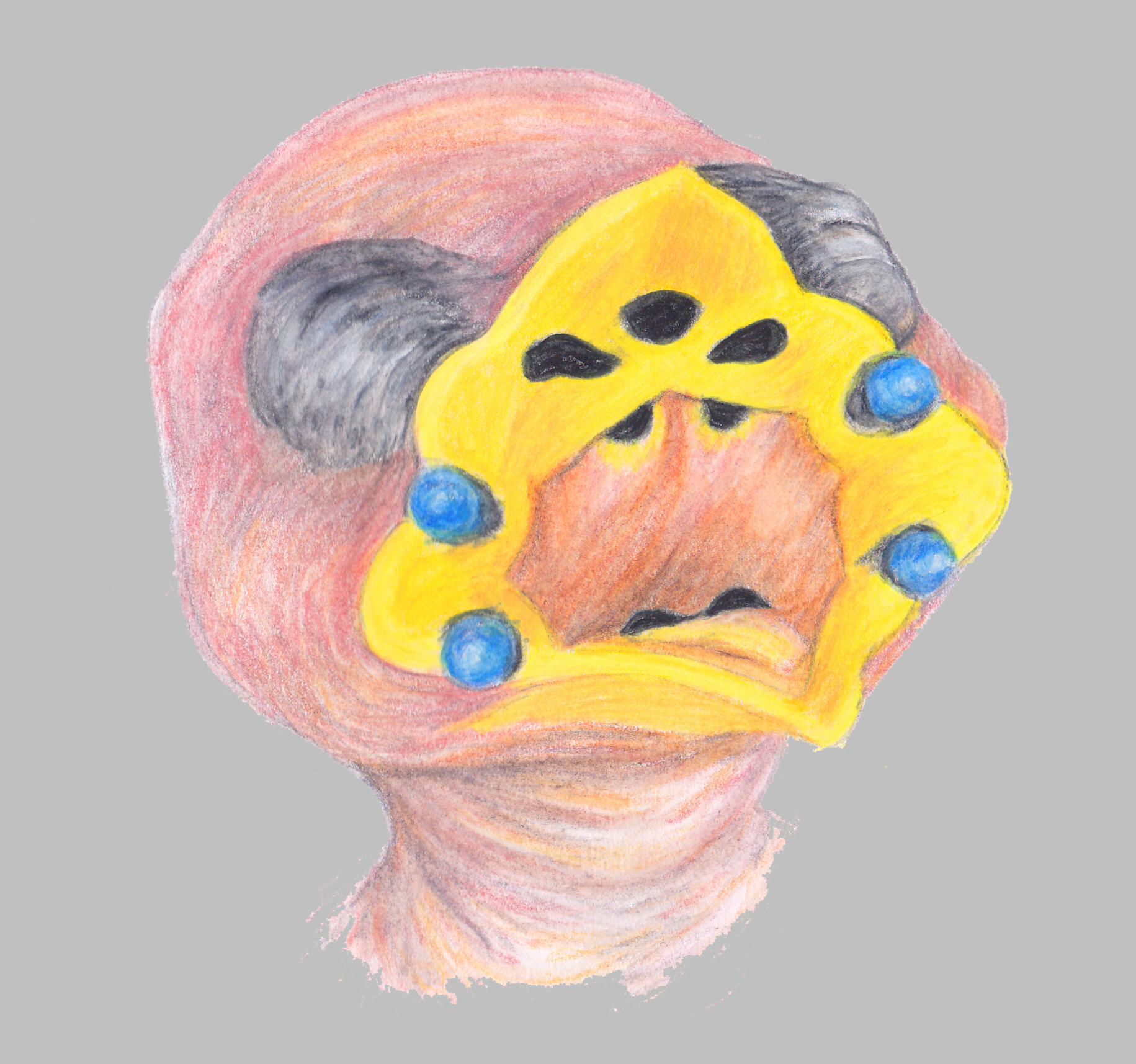
Parrotfinch chicks have blue papillae at the corners of the gape, and distinctive mouth markings.

This species has a courtship flight conducted above the trees. The pair fly on a strongly oscillating path with one bird ascending while the other is descending, both calling constantly. After display, the birds land on a branch for a mating ritual which starts with locking bills, followed by the female hanging upside-down for a variable period of time, and then copulation while the male holds the female's neck. The flight and mating rituals have been recorded for three-coloured and red-throated parrotfinches, and may be typical for the genus. The nest is built with fresh grass blades, and is domed with a side entrance. It is always hidden in thick foliage, but can be at any height from the ground. The normal clutch is four spherical whitish eggs. Chicks are naked and have pinkish skin; the distinctive gape has blue nodular spots technically termed as papillae or tubercles at the upper and lower corners, and the yellow palate has a ring of five black spots. Most young estrildid finches beg for food with their wings held against the side, but juvenile parrotfinches lift the wing on the side away from the feeding parent. This behaviour may restrict competition for food from other nestlings.

When not breeding, the Fiji parrotfinch is gregarious, and is usually found in small flocks of up to six birds. It feeds on seeds, usually at the "milk" (watery ripe) stage. A favourite is the Guinea grass, Megathyrsus maximus. The finch will also take seed from rice ears, and its spread into gardens has been aided by another preferred food plant, carpet grass, Axonopus compressus, which is a common lawn grass in Fiji. This finch readily takes insects, often extracted from under loose bark or tree crevices. It also feeds on nectar and small berries. In some areas, this finch's diet may bring it into conflict with rice growers, but there is no evidence that this protected species is seen as a serious agricultural threat either in Fiji, or in Australia, where it is kept in captivity in small numbers.

== Predators and parasites ==
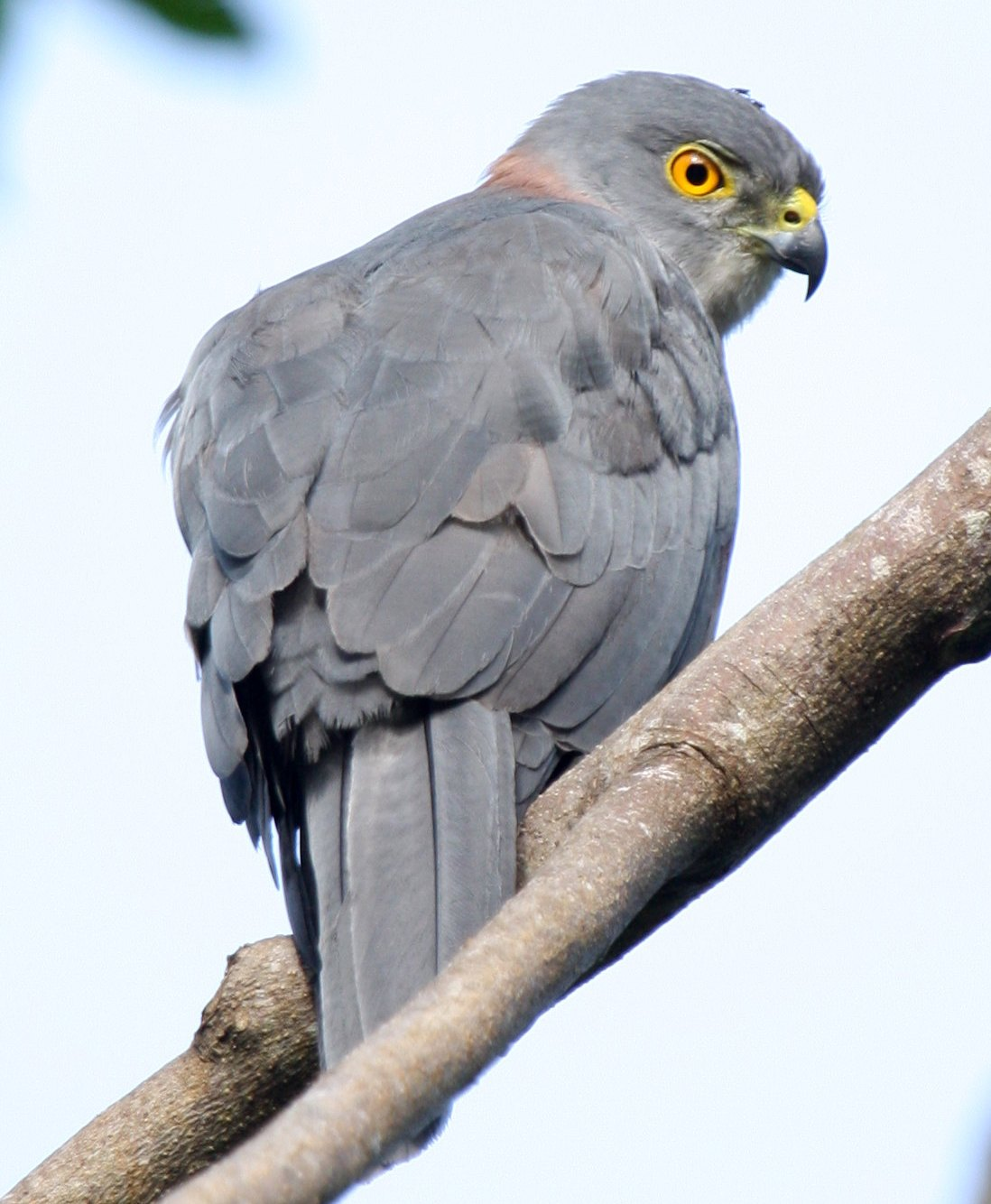
The endemic Fiji goshawk is a specialist predator of small birds.

The common endemic Fiji goshawk is a specialist predator of small and medium-sized birds, and the swamp harrier is also a widespread predator, often taking fledglings. The local subspecies of the peregrine falcon, Falco peregrinus nesiotes will hunt finches, but is itself rare and declining. Barn owls eat mainly rats, but sometimes take small birds. Rats and mice use Fiji parrotfinch nests, and may be significant predators of the species, and the small Asian mongoose will prey on birds feeding on the ground. The fan-tailed cuckoo, which has an endemic Fijian subspecies, is a brood parasite, but the parrotfinch does not appear to be a host of this large cuckoo.

No specific parasites of Fiji parrotfinch have been recorded, but microsporidiosis and avian malaria, both spread by parasites, have been found in captive populations of other parrotfinch species.

== Status ==
The Fijian parrotfinch is endemic to a single country; although its population is unknown, it is described as uncommon or locally common. In the absence of evidence for any decline in numbers, its population is believed to be stable, and it is therefore classed as Least Concern on the IUCN Red List. It is protected under Schedule 2 of Fiji's Endangered and Protected Species Act 2002, which regulates the import and trade of species that are not thought to be at a high risk of extinction, but may be threatened if trade in those species is not regulated. In the early 20th century, Europeans in Fiji kept these finches as cagebirds, calling them croton finches because of their liking for the croton bush, but the pet trade appears not to be a significant factor at present.

Fiji's native birdlife has been badly affected by agriculture, deforestation and introduced pests like rats and mongooses. Although Important Bird Areas have been established on Taveuni and the forest east of Vanua Levu, conservation problems persist. The Fiji parrotfinch has adapted well to man-made landscapes; it is neither a ground nor hole nester, so it avoids predation from the mongoose and competition for nest sites with introduced common and jungle mynas. Introduced rodents are able to access the nests and may affect breeding productivity. The potential introduction of other species, such as snakes, or diseases like avian malaria could lead to major losses among bird species.

== Cited texts ==
- Brookes, Ian, ed. (2006). The Chambers Dictionary (ninth ed.). Edinburgh: Chambers. ISBN 0-550-10185-3.
- Clements, Peter; Harris, Alan; Davis, John (1993). Finches and Sparrows. London: Christopher Helm. ISBN 0-7136-8017-2.
- Watling, Dick (2003). A Guide to the Birds of Fiji and Western Polynesia. Suva, Fiji: Environmental Consultants. ISBN 982-9030-04-0.
