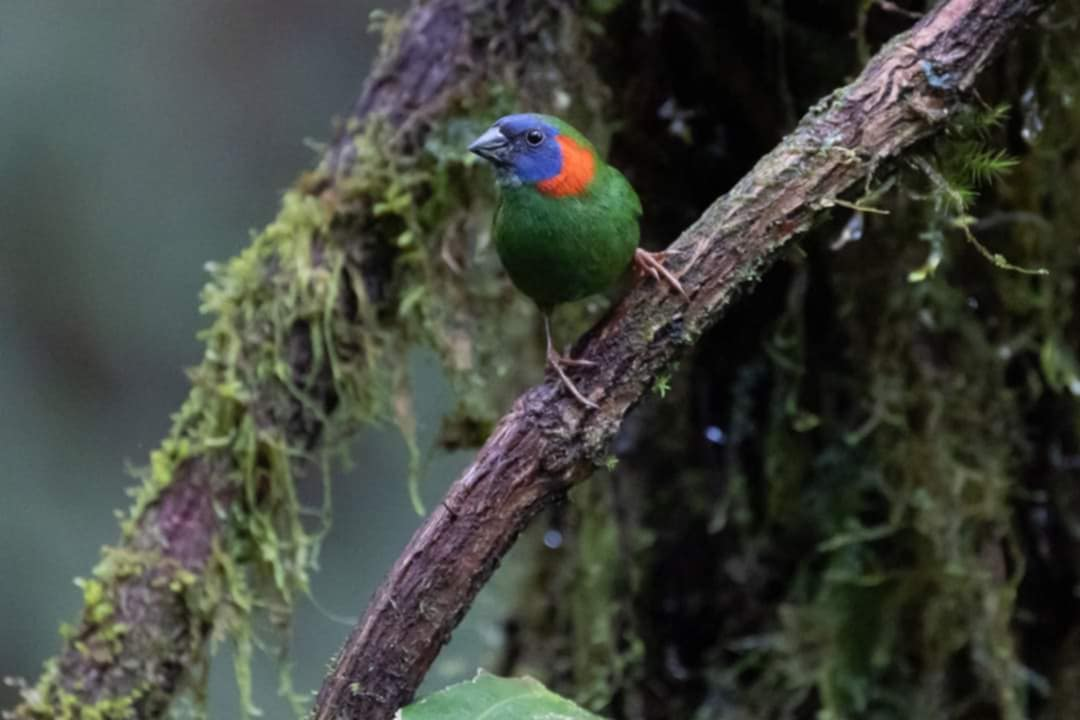

Conservation status
- Least Concern (IUCN 3.1)

Scientific classification
- Kingdom: Animalia
- Phylum: Chordata
- Class: Aves
- Order: Passeriformes
- Family: Estrildidae
- Genus: Erythrura
- Species: E. coloria

Binomial name
- Erythrura coloria Ripley & Rabor, 1961

= Red-eared parrotfinch =

Species of bird

The red-eared parrotfinch (Erythrura coloria) is a species of estrildid finch endemic to Mindanao in the Philippines. It's known for its striking plumage of a green body, a blue face and the eponymous red-ear. It is found in tropical montane forest above 1,000 metres (3,280 ft) above sea level.

== Description and taxonomy ==
This is a small bird found in the mountains of Mindanao. It is primarily green with a bright red rump and crescent surrounding its blue patch on its cheek. Like all parrotfinches, it has a thick connical bill to specialize in eating seeds. It exhibits sexual dimorphism in which the female has slighhtly drabber colors.

Its call is described as a short high pitched trill.

== Ecology and behavior ==
Unlike the green-faced parrotfinch (E. viridifacies), it does not appear to be strongly dependent on bamboo, and is therefore less irruptive, unpredictable and vulnerable than that species. Diet consists of seeds of grasses, thistles, opium and flax. Also feeds on fruits and small insects. This species has recorded feeding on the non-native coffee berries. Forages low and close to the ground. Forages alone or in small groups.

Not much published data on wild breeding behaviour. Breeding season is believed to be from January to April. Nest is made of mosses. Based on birds in captivity, clutch size is 1 to 3 eggs and takes 14 days to incubate, nestling period is 21 to 23 days and an additional feeding period of 14 days. Adult plumage is reached in 3 to 4 months.

== Habitat and conservation status ==
The species inhabits forest understorey and edge, second growth and grassy clearings at altitude over 1,000 m (3,280 ft). The IUCN has classified as Least Concern but was formerly listed as near threatened. Despite its limited range, it is said to be locally common. As it occurs in rugged and inaccessible mountains, this has allowed a large portion of its habitat to remain intact. However, there it is still affected by habitat loss through deforestation, mining, land conversion and slash-and-burn - just not to the same extent as lowland forest.

This species is kept in captivity and bred for aviculture.
