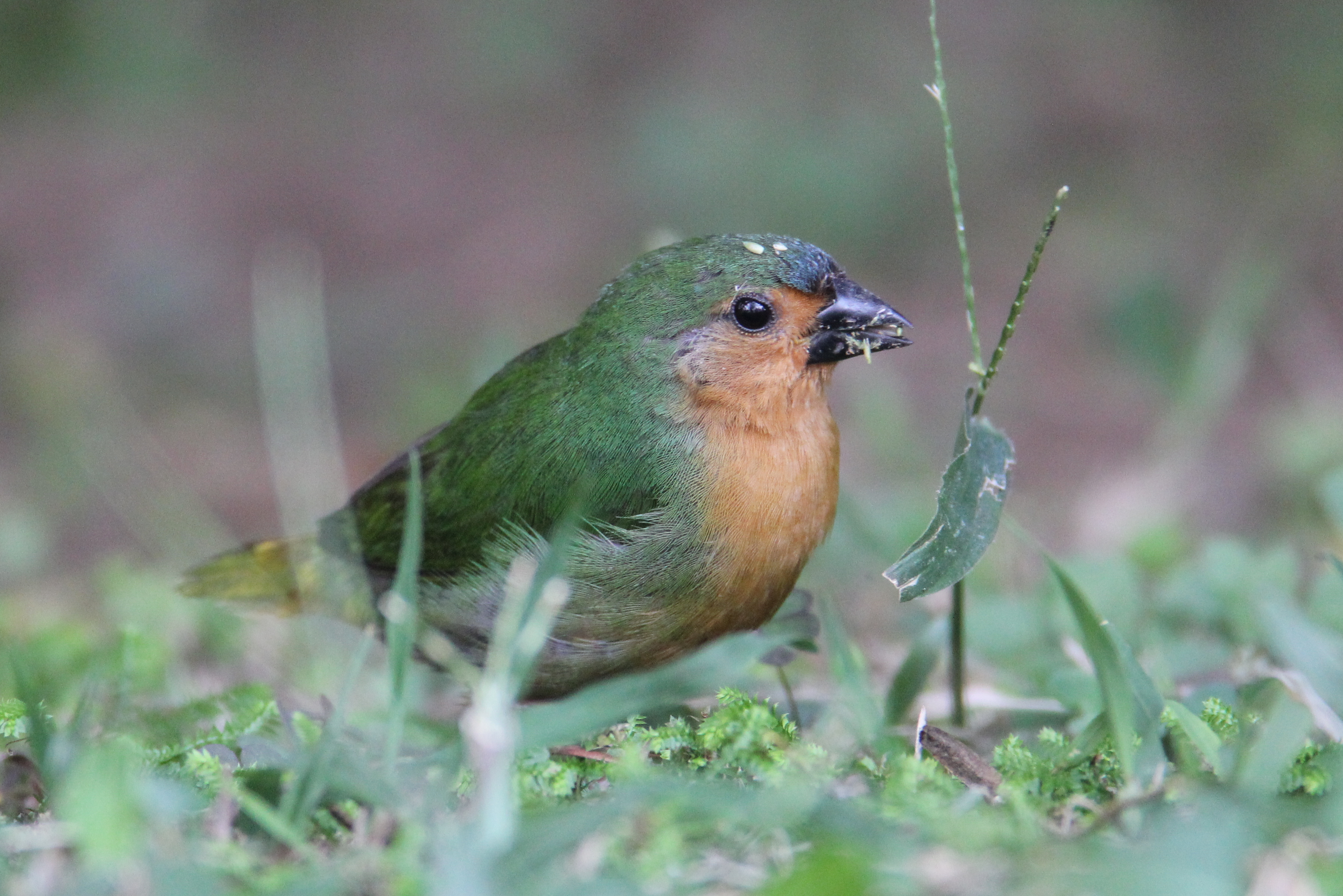
- at Cibodas Botanical Garden, West Java, Indonesia

Conservation status
- Least Concern (IUCN 3.1)

Scientific classification
- Kingdom: Animalia
- Phylum: Chordata
- Class: Aves
- Order: Passeriformes
- Family: Estrildidae
- Genus: Erythrura
- Species: E. hyperythra

Binomial name
- Erythrura hyperythra (Reichenbach, 1862)

= Tawny-breasted parrotfinch =

Species of bird

The tawny-breasted parrotfinch (Erythrura hyperythra) is a species of estrildid finch found in Indonesia, Malaysia and the Philippines. It is found in tropical montane moist forests, grassy clearings and forest edges. The IUCN has classified the species as being of least concern.

== Description and taxonomy ==
It is emerald green, with an orange face and chest. Both sexes have a blue forehead patch, though this is brighter and more pronounced in males than in females.

=== Subspecies ===
Five subspecies are currently recognised, though recent genetic analysis has shown that there may be a phylogenetic split between the Javan and Philippine populations.

- E. h. hyperythra – Found in Java with unconfirmed reports on Bali;
- E. h. microrhyncha – Found in Sulawesi; paler and duller with less blue on the head and is smaller
- E. h. borneensis – Found in the mountains of the Malay Peninsula and Borneo; blue on the forehead more extensive and reaches to the hindcrown
- E. h. brunneiventris – Found in Luzon, Mindoro and Panay; shorter bill, hindcrown all the way to the rump and tail is bright green, underparts are also paler and flanks with blue tinges
- E. h. intermedia – Found in Lombok, Sumbawa and Flores; uppertail coverts are green with an orange wash

== Ecology and behavior ==
This species feeds on the seeds of grasses including bamboo, as well as the seeds of Persicaria chinensis. Insects make up a small part of its diet, as do the fruits of some species of Ficus. It typically forages on the ground in bamboo forests, but is also seen foraging in clearings, along forest edges, or in rice fields. Foraging can occur alone or in pairs, though small flocks are more common.

This species is known to breed from February to March in Java, and in May to June on Flores. Nests have been found in the crowns of trees. Nesting material includes grasses, ferns, and roots, which are fashioned into an enclosed nest with an entrance. Surrounding features such as branches, epiphytic orchids, or mosses have been used to obscure the nest entrance.

It lays 4 to 6 eggs with an incubation period of 14 days. Both parents contribute to nest-building and the feeding of young. The period from hatching to fledging is 3 to 4 weeks, though parents continue to feed the young for a further two weeks after fledging.

== Habitat and conservation status ==
Its habitat varies depending on locality. Habitats include montane forests and scrublands, bamboo forests, edge habitat, broadleaf evergreen forests, as well as grassy clearings and agricultural development. The elevations of these habitats fall anywhere within 600-3300m across their whole range.

This species has been assessed as IUCN Red List as a Least-concern species. Across most of its range, it is described as rare, especially in the Philippines, Bali, Peninsular Malaysia, Borneo. It is more common in Wallacea. This species has a wide range and its preference for montane habitat means that a large area of habitat is more secure from deforestation due to inaccessibility.
