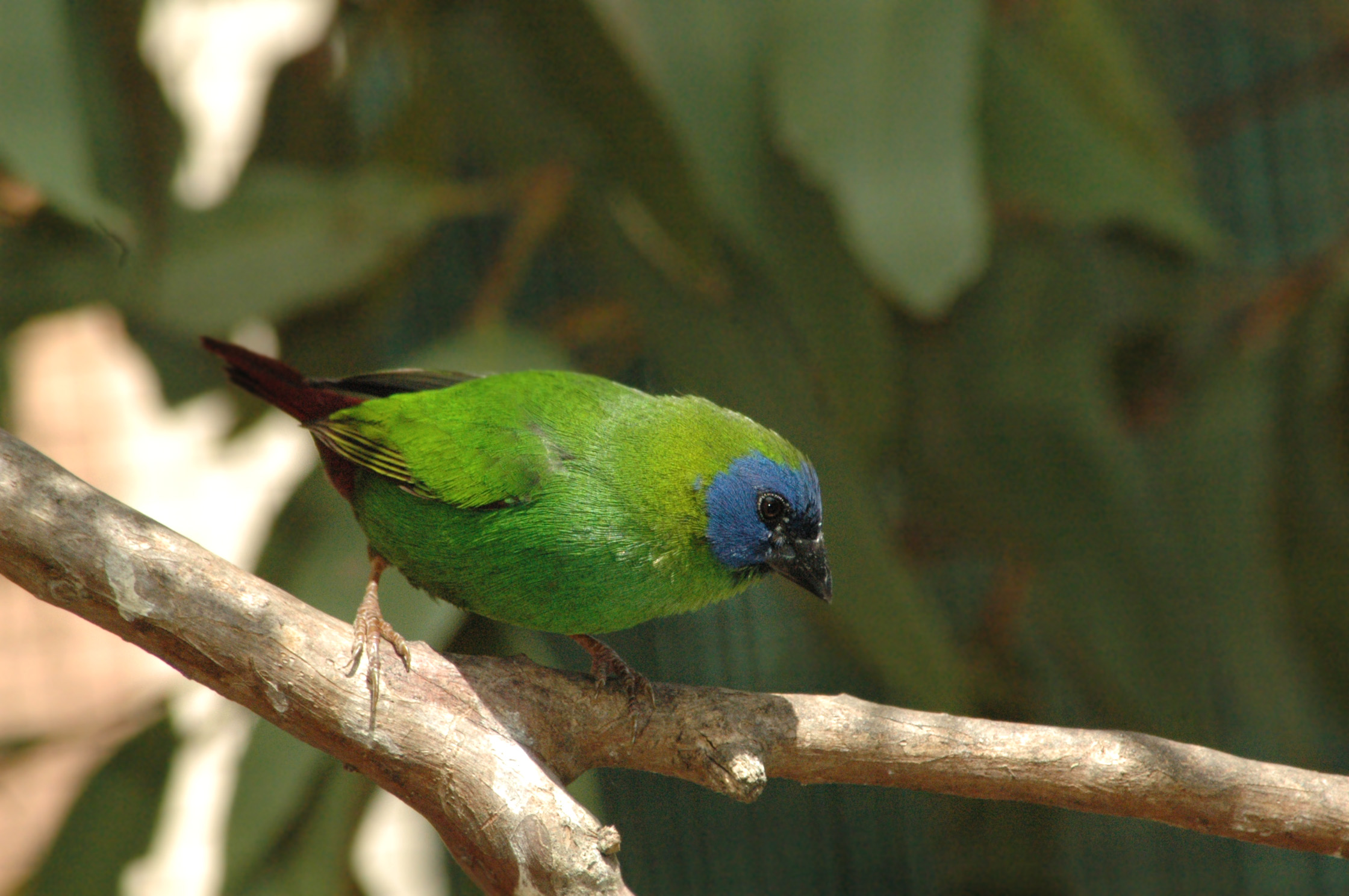

Conservation status
- Least Concern (IUCN 3.1)

Scientific classification
- Kingdom: Animalia
- Phylum: Chordata
- Class: Aves
- Order: Passeriformes
- Family: Estrildidae
- Genus: Erythrura
- Species: E. trichroa

Binomial name
- Erythrura trichroa (Kittlitz, 1833)
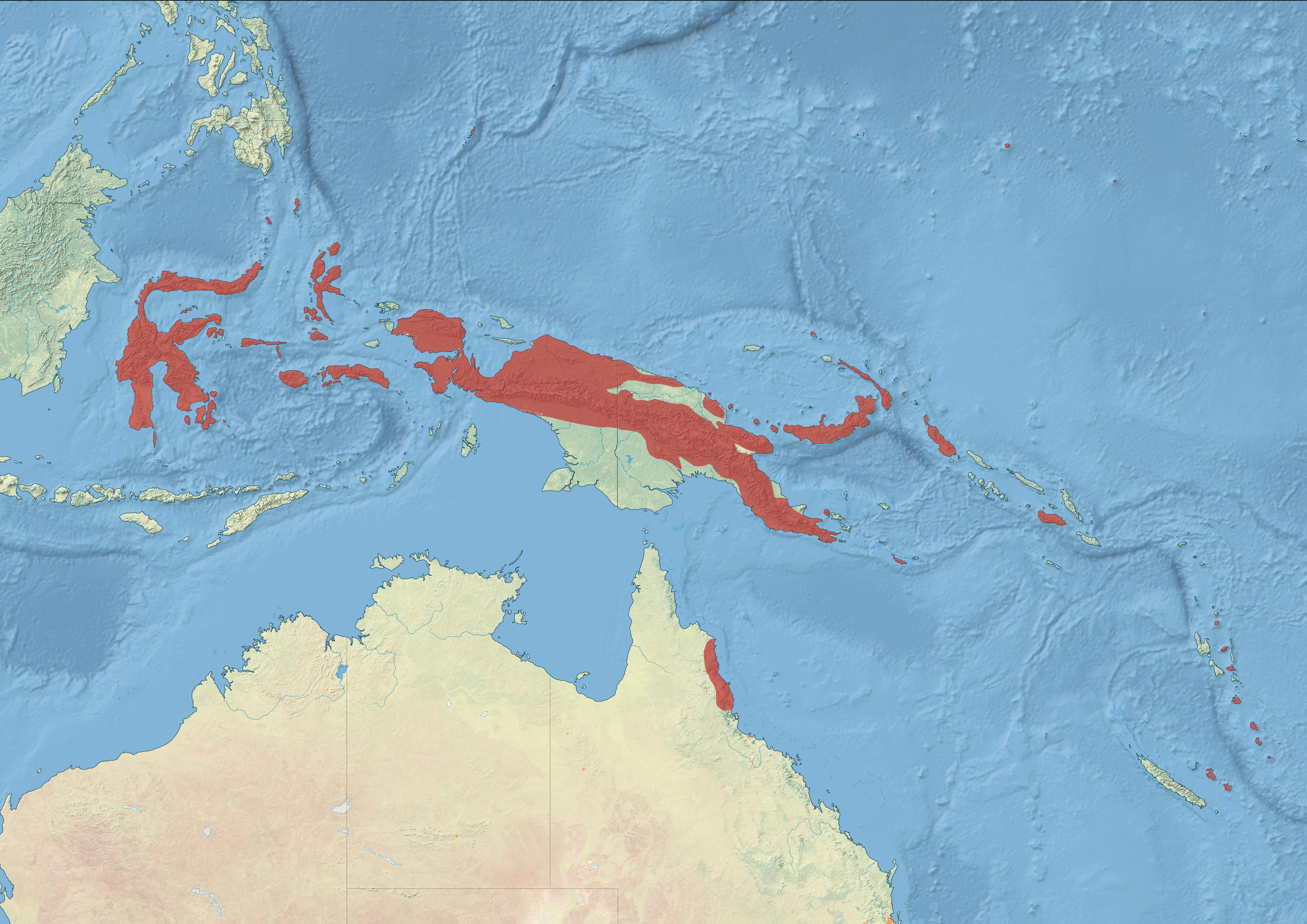
- Distribution

= Blue-faced parrotfinch =

Species of bird

The blue-faced parrotfinch (Erythrura trichroa) is a locally common species of estrildid finch found in north-eastern Australia, eastern Indonesia, Papua New Guinea, the Solomon Islands, Vanuatu and New Caledonia, with disjunct populations in Micronesia and Palau. It has an estimated global extent of occurrence of 10,000,000 km^{2}.

It is found in subtropical and tropical zones in both montane and lowland moist forest areas, where it is most often associated with forest edges and disturbed habitat. It feeds largely on seeds of grasses, including in Australia several exotic genera especially Brachiaria. The IUCN has classified the species as being of least concern.

== Taxonomy ==
The blue-faced parrotfinch was formally described and illustrated in 1833 by German naturalist Heinrich von Kittlitz based on a specimen collected on the island of Ualan (now Kosrae), one of the Caroline Islands which lie to the north of New Guinea. Kittlitz coined the binomial name Fringilla trichroa where the specific epithet combines the Ancient Greek ρι-/tri- meaning "three-" with χροα/khroa, χροας/khroas meaning "colour" or "appearance". The blue-faced parrotfinch is now one of the 12 species placed in the genus Erythrura that was introduced in 1837 by the English naturalist William Swainson.

In the past, due to less developed observation techniques, very few blue-faced parrotfinches were spotted. As a result, they were overlooked in historical surveys and categorized as rare. When describing the subspecies Erythrura trichroa macgillivrayi in 1914 based on a specimen that had been collected in North Queensland, the Australian-born ornithologist Gregory Mathews used the English name "Australian green-backed finch".

The first blue-faced parrotfinch was recorded in North Queensland, Australia in 1890. This specimen had a length of 121 mm (4.8 in). Its wings were 62 mm (2.4 in), its tail was 50 mm (2.0 in), and its culmen was 11 mm (0.4 in). It is now kept in the Melbourne Museum. There were other important discoveries of the blue-faced parrotfinch in 1899, 1913 and 1914, all of which were spotted in north or north-eastern Queensland.

Eleven subspecies are now recognised:

- E. t. sanfordi Stresemann, 1931 – montane Sulawesi
- E. t. modesta Wallace, 1862 – montane Halmahera to Bacan Islands (north Moluccas)
- E. t. pinaiae Stresemann, 1914 – montane Buru and Seram (central Moluccas)
- E. t. sigillifer (De Vis, 1897) – New Guinea and northeast, southeast satellites, New Ireland, New Britain and satellites (east Bismarck Archipelago)
- E. t. macgillivrayi Mathews, 1914 – southeast Cape York Peninsula, northeast Queensland (northeast Australia)
- E. t. eichhorni Hartert, EJO, 1924 – St. Matthias (=Mussau Island) and Emirau Island (to southeast; central north Bismarck Archipelago)
- E. t. pelewensis Kuroda & Nm, 1922 – Palau (west Caroline Islands, west Micronesia)
- E. t. clara Taka-Tsukasa & Yamashina, 1931 – Chuuk and Pohnpei (central, east Caroline Islands, central Micronesia)
- E. t. trichroa (Kittlitz, 1833) – Kosrae (east Caroline Islands, central Micronesia)
- E. t. woodfordi Rothschild & Hartert, EJO, 1900 – Guadalcanal and probably Bougainville Island and Kolombangara (Solomon Islands)
- E. t. cyanofrons Layard, EL, 1878 – Gaua (south Banks Islands) to Anatom (=Aneityum; north to south Vanuatu) and Lifou and Maré (central, east Loyalty Islands)

== Description ==
Blue-faced parrotfinch males are multi-shaded with colors ranging from light yellow-green to dark blue-green. On their forehead and face, there are deep blue feathers, and their tails are generally red to rusty red-brown. In terms of length, they are typically 13 cm (5.1 in) long. The female is less vibrant blue and is slightly smaller with a more rounded head.

Among the birds found in Queensland, there was no significant difference in plumage, bill shapes, or genetic composition. This is hypothesized to be caused by nomadic behaviors and the continued gene flow.

== Distribution and habitat ==
The blue-faced parrotfinches prefer rainforest edges and dense grasslands that have woody plants, and they prefer to roost in rainforests. They are widely distributed and found at various altitudes, ranging from sea-level on hot tropical islands to 800–3000 m in New Guinea. It is reported that the blue-faced parrotfinches engage in seasonal and nomadic movements, partly due to their cold-sensitiveness. In the winter, they migrate to the lowlands where there is excessive rainforest clearance.

== Behaviour ==
The blue-faced parrotfinches are inconspicuous and timid, retreating to grasslands for cover.

=== Feeding ===
Blue-faced parrotfinches feed on grass and bamboo seeds, small insects, and figs. They primarily consume seeds of Brachiaria decumbens (Signal Grass), then the seeds of Lantana camara (West Indian Lantana), Panicum maximum (Guinea Grass), and A. patrei. They are adaptive enough to eat introduced food sources when they appear.

They forage primarily by perching (at an average height of 0.96 m) and less frequently by climbing and pecking. Due to this, there is not much strong competition between blue-faced parrotfinches and their sympatric species, who tend to forage primarily by climbing. Another reason for this lack of competition is that blue-faced parrotfinches partition food resources with other species by foraging at different preferred microhabitats.

Blue-faced parrotfinches are generally seen in patches, occasionally with 30 or more birds. The number of finches seen together increases in response to sufficient food resources.

=== Breeding ===
The females usually lay an average of four eggs, with a maximum of eight. The average incubation time is 15 days, during which the female does most of the incubation and brooding. Meanwhile, the male is responsible for feeding the nestlings. The nestlings fledge around 21 days and continue to be fed by their parents for 10 to 20 days.
