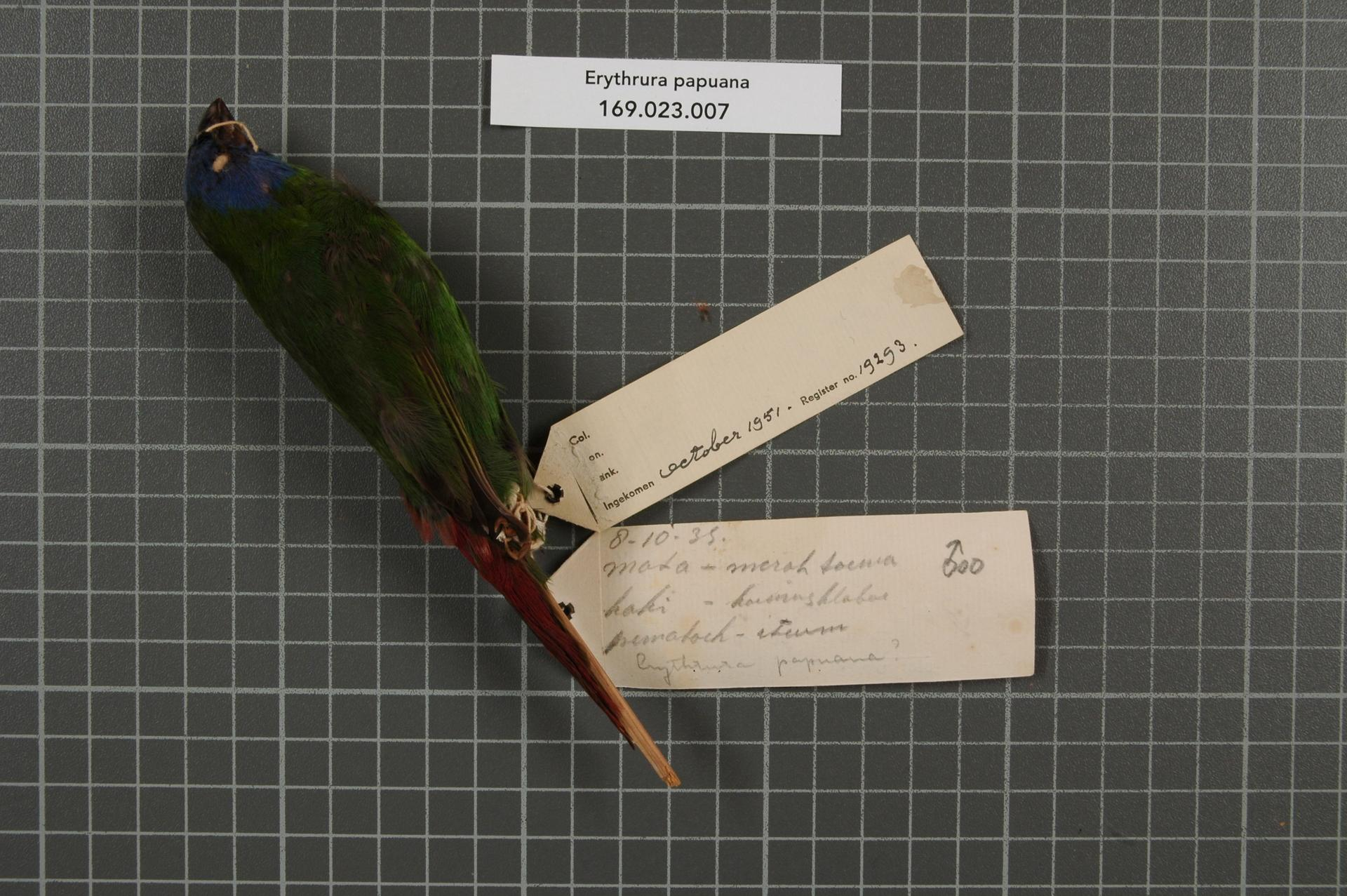

Conservation status
- Least Concern (IUCN 3.1)

Scientific classification
- Kingdom: Animalia
- Phylum: Chordata
- Class: Aves
- Order: Passeriformes
- Family: Estrildidae
- Genus: Erythrura
- Species: E. papuana

Binomial name
- Erythrura papuana Rothschild & Hartert, 1900

= Papuan parrotfinch =

Species of bird

The Papuan parrotfinch (Erythrura papuana) is a common species of estrildid finch found in New Guinea. It has an estimated global extent of occurrence of 50,000 to 100,000 km^{2}. There is some doubt as to whether this species and the blue-faced parrotfinch (E. trichroa) are conspecific.

It is found in subtropical and tropical montane moist forest. The IUCN has classified the species as being of least concern.
