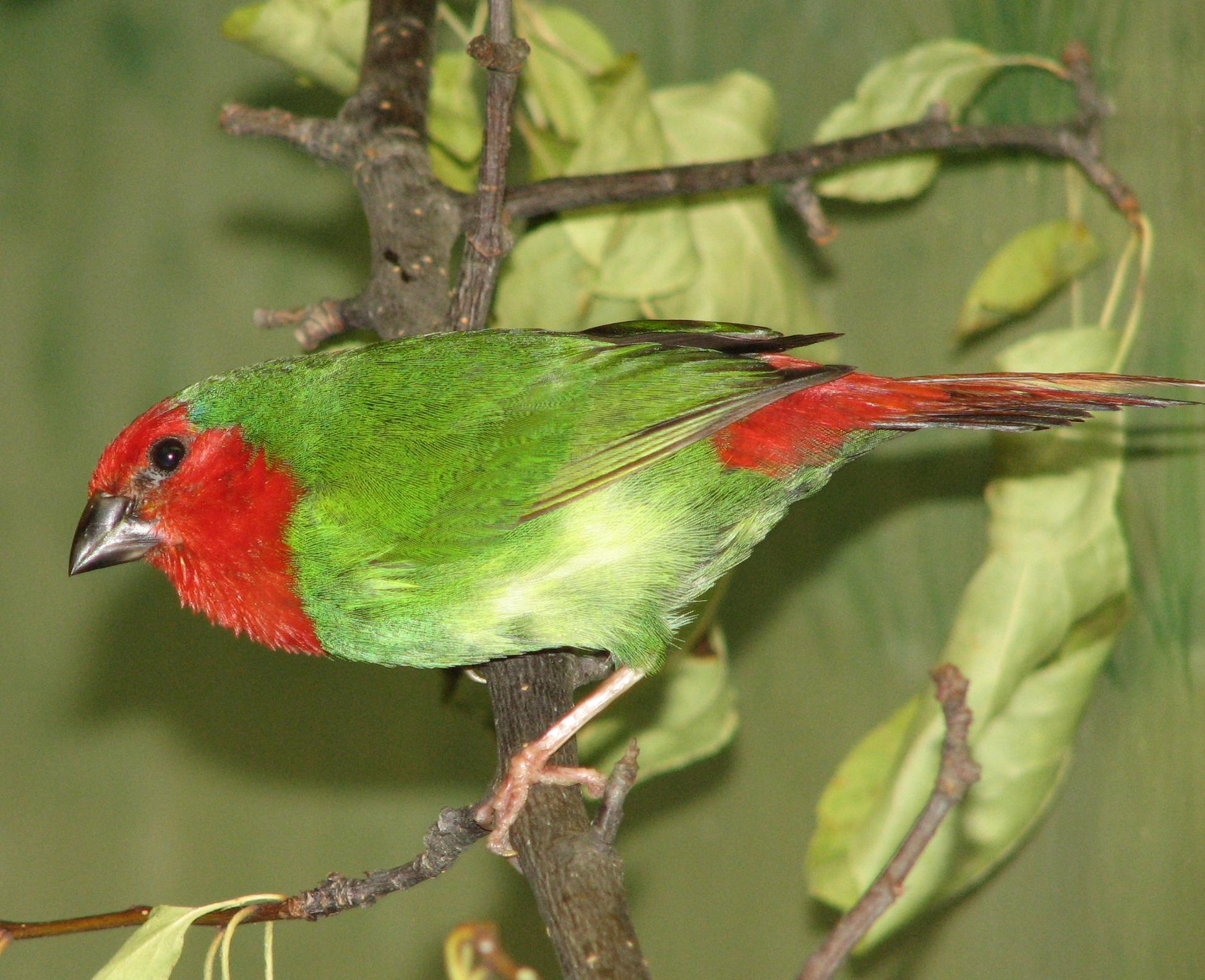
- Red-throated parrotfinch (Erythrura psittacea)

Scientific classification
- Kingdom: Animalia
- Phylum: Chordata
- Class: Aves
- Order: Passeriformes
- Family: Estrildidae
- Genus: Erythrura; Swainson, 1837

Type species
- Erythura viridis = Loxia prasina Swainson, 1837

Species
- See text

= Parrotfinch =

Parrotfinches

Genus of birds

Parrotfinches are small, colourful passerine birds belonging to the genus Erythrura in the family Estrildidae, the estrildid finches. They occur from Southeast Asia to northeastern Australia, Melanesia and Samoa. They inhabit forest, bamboo thickets and grassland and some can be found in man-made habitats such as farmland, parks and gardens. Several species are commonly kept as cagebirds.

They are 9 to 15 cm (3.5–5.9 in) long. The plumage is usually mainly green. Most species have blue or red markings on the head and a red rump and tail. The tail is pointed and often fairly long.

Seeds, especially those of grasses, comprise the bulk of the diet. Some parrotfinches also feed on fruit and small insects. Many species forage in flocks, keeping in contact with high-pitched calls.

Three species, the green-faced, royal and pink-billed parrotfinches, are classed as vulnerable to extinction because of habitat loss and degradation.

== Taxonomy ==
The genus Erythrura was introduced in 1837 by the English naturalist William Swainson to accommodate the pin-tailed parrotfinch. Swainson misspelled the genus name as "Erythura". The name combines the Ancient Greek eruthros meaning "red" with -ouros meaning "-tailed". The genus Erythrura is sister to the Gouldian finch which is placed in its own genus Chloebia and together the two genera form the subfamily Erythrurinae.

The cladogram shown below is based on a molecular phylogenetic study of the Erythrura parrotfinches published in 2023. The Papuan parrotfinch (E. papuana) was found to embedded within the broadly distributed blue-faced parrotfinch (E. trichroa).

- Erythrura
  - Pink-billed parrotfinch (E. kleinschmidti)
  - - - Pin-tailed parrotfinch (E. prasina)
      - - Green-faced parrotfinch (E. viridifacies)
        - Tawny-breasted parrotfinch (E. hyperythra)
    - - Red-throated parrotfinch (E. psittacea)
      - - - Red-headed parrotfinch (E. cyaneovirens)
          - - Fiji parrotfinch (E. pealii)
            - Royal parrotfinch (E. regia)
        - - Tricolored parrotfinch (E. tricolor)
          - - Red-eared parrotfinch (E. coloria)
            - Blue-faced parrotfinch (E. trichroa), Papuan parrotfinch (E. papuana)

=== Species ===
The genus contains the following 12 species.

Image	Scientific name	Common name	Distribution
	Pin-tailed parrotfinch	Erythrura prasina	Malaysia, Brunei, Cambodia, Indonesia, Laos, Burma, Vietnam, Thailand and China
	Green-faced parrotfinch	Erythrura viridifacies	northern Philippines (Cebu, Luzon, Mindoro, Negros and Panay)
	Tawny-breasted parrotfinch or green-tailed parrotfinch	Erythrura hyperythra	Indonesia, Malaysia and the Philippines
	Red-throated parrotfinch	Erythrura psittacea	New Caledonia
	Fiji parrotfinch (split from red-headed parrotfinch)	Erythrura pealii	Fiji (Viti Levu, Vanua Levu, Taveuni and Kadavu)
	Royal parrotfinch (split from red-headed parrotfinch)	Erythrura regia	Vanuatu
	Red-headed parrotfinch	Erythrura cyaneovirens	Samoan Islands
	Pink-billed parrotfinch	Erythrura kleinschmidti	Viti Levu, Fiji
	Tricolored parrotfinch or three-coloured parrotfinch	Erythrura tricolor	Timor and the southern Moluccas
	Red-eared parrotfinch or Mount Katanglad parrotfinch	Erythrura coloria	Mindanao in the Philippines
	Papuan parrotfinch	Erythrura papuana	New Guinea
	Blue-faced parrotfinch	Erythrura trichroa	north-eastern Australia, eastern Indonesia, New Caledonia, Palau (introduced), Papua New Guinea, the Solomon Islands and Vanuatu
