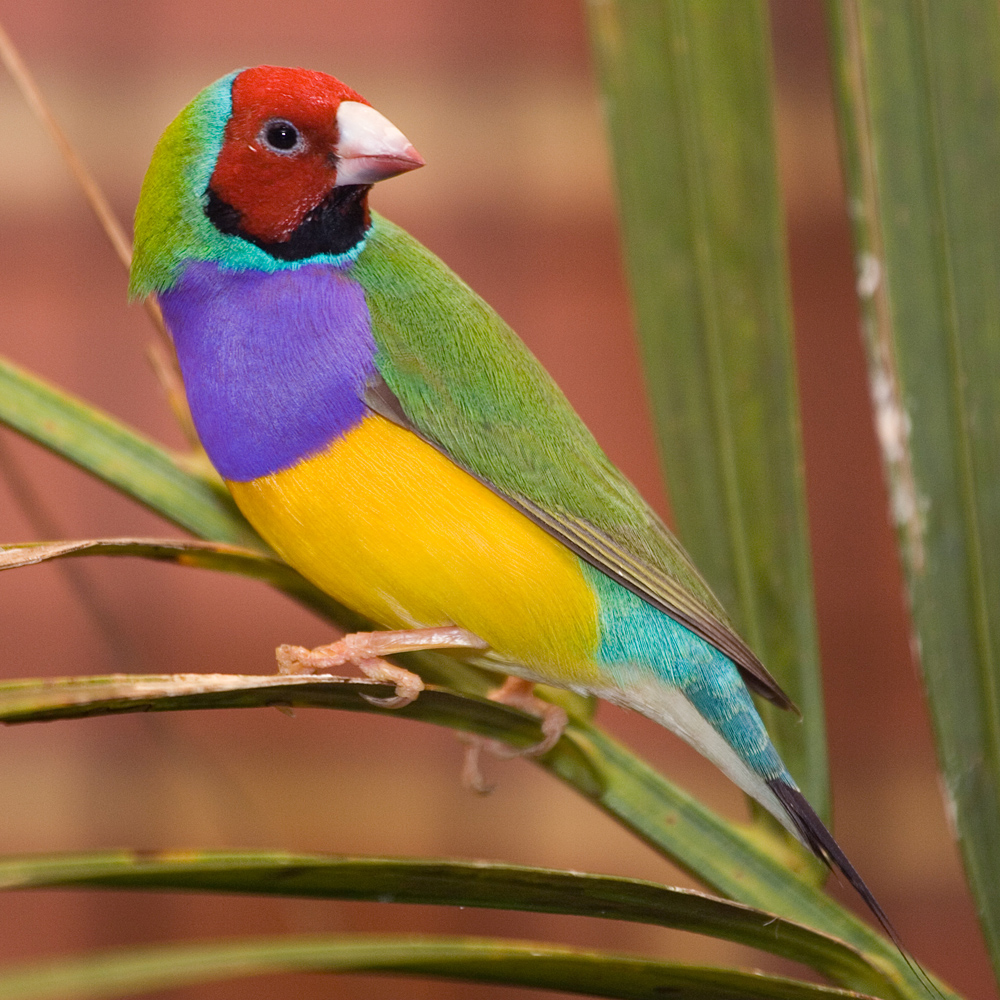
- Adult red-headed male

Conservation status
- Least Concern (IUCN 3.1)

- Endangered (EPBC Act)

Scientific classification
- Kingdom: Animalia
- Phylum: Chordata
- Class: Aves
- Order: Passeriformes
- Family: Estrildidae
- Genus: Chloebia; Reichenbach, 1862
- Species: C. gouldiae

Binomial name
- Chloebia gouldiae (Gould, 1844)
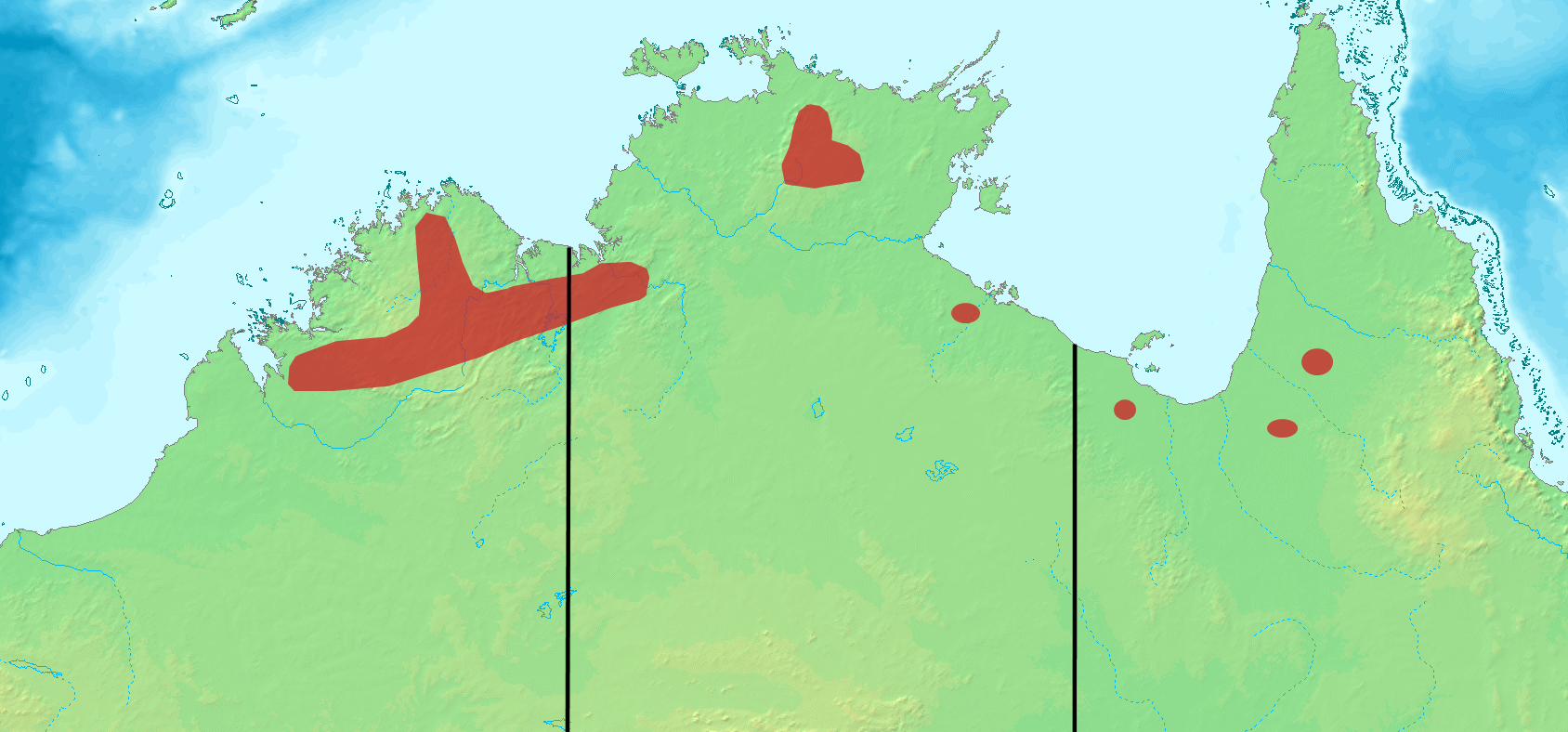
- Distribution

Synonyms
- Amadina gouldiae Gould, 1844; Poephila mirabilis Des Murs; Poephila armitiana Ramsay; Chloebia gouldiae (Gould, 1844)

= Gouldian finch =

Passerine bird native to Australia

The Gouldian finch (Chloebia gouldiae), also known as the Gould's finch or the rainbow finch, is a colourful passerine bird that is native to Australia.

== Taxonomy ==
The Gouldian finch was described by British ornithologist John Gould in 1844 as Amadina gouldiae, in honour of his deceased wife Elizabeth. Specimens of the bird were sent to him by British naturalist Benjamin Bynoe, although they had been described some years before by French naturalists Jacques Bernard Hombron and Honoré Jacquinot. It is also known as the rainbow finch, Gould's finch, or sometimes just Gould. The Gouldian finch is sister to the parrotfinches in the genus Erythrura.

== Description ==
Both sexes are brightly coloured with black, green, yellow, and red markings. The females tend to be less brightly coloured. One major difference between the sexes is that the male's chest is purple, while the female's is a lighter mauve.

Gouldian finches are about 125–140 mm (4.9–5.5 in) long. Their heads may be red, black, or yellow. Formerly considered three different kinds of finches, it is now known that these are colour variants of one species that exist in the wild. Selective breeding has also developed mutations (blue, yellow and silver instead of a green back) in both body and breast colour.

There are several "prominent rounded tubercles" with an "opalescent lustre" at the back of the gape of nestlings. These tubercles are commonly (and incorrectly) described as phosphorescent in spite of much scientific evidence to the contrary. It is believed that these tubercles simply reflect light and are not luminescent.

== Distribution and habitat ==
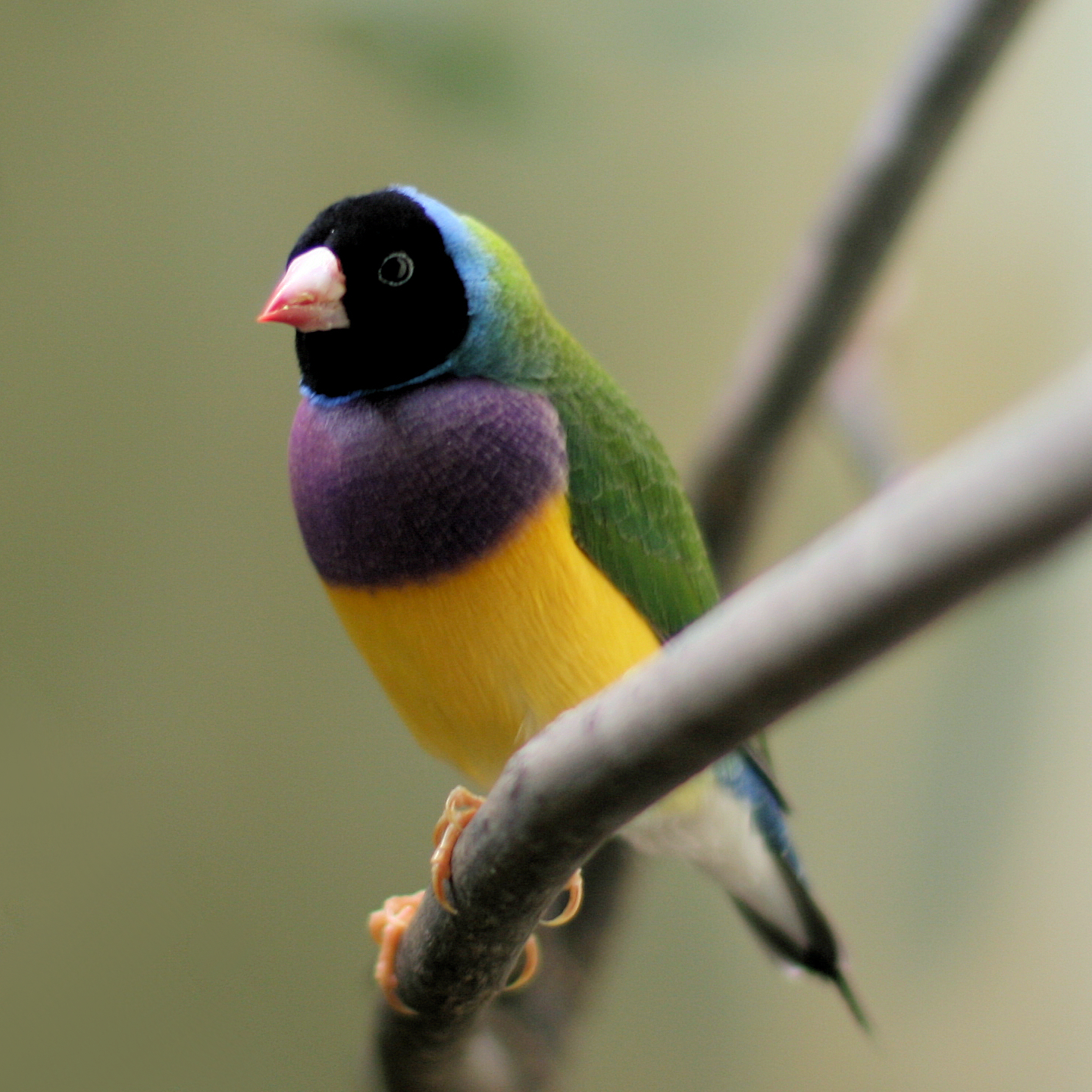
Black-headed male Gouldian finch

Gouldian finches are native to northern Australia, in particular the Kimberley and Northern Territory.

Prior to the Australian government's ban on the export of Australian fauna, Gouldian finches were exported worldwide, which has resulted in viable captive breeding populations being held in many countries.

=== Conservation status ===
This species has been considered an Endangered species by the Australian Government in the last two "Endangered Species Act"s - the Australian Endangered Species Protection Act (ESPA) of 1992 and the Environment Protection and Biodiversity Conservation (EPBC) Act, 1999. Its status on the IUCN Red List is currently Least concern, but it was considered to be endangered previously: Threatened in 1988, EN in six assessments between 1994 and 2008, and Near threatened in three assessments between 2012 and 2016.

The number of Gouldian finches in the wild decreased dramatically in the 20th century due to human-caused habitat loss. The population went from hundreds of thousands in the early 20th century to 2,500 or fewer by the 1980s. The current estimated population continues to be 2,500 or fewer birds. Early research suggested that a parasite called the air sac mite was responsible for the species' decline, but the mite is no longer considered a major factor. The primary threat to wild Gouldian finch populations is an increase in extensive wildfires in the late dry season of its native habitat, which negatively impacts the availability of both tree hollows for breeding, and the seeds that comprise the bulk of the Gouldian finch's diet. Cyclones and climate change have also negatively impacted tree hollow availability in the Northern Territory.

== Behaviour ==
Outside the breeding season, Gouldian finches often join mixed flocks consisting of long-tailed finches and masked finches. Flocks can consist of up to 1,000–2,000 individuals. During the breeding season, they are normally found on rough scree slopes where vegetation is sparse. In the dry season, they are much more nomadic and will move to wherever their food and water can be found.

=== Feeding ===
Like other finches, the Gouldian finch is a seed eater. They eat up to 30% of their bodyweight each day. During the breeding season, Gouldian finches mainly feed on ripe and half-ripe grass seeds of sorghum. During the dry season, they mainly forage on the ground for seeds. During the wet season, spinifex grass seed (Triodia sp.) is an important part of their diet. So far Gouldians have been recorded eating six different species of grass seed, but researchers have yet to find evidence of insect consumption.

=== Breeding ===
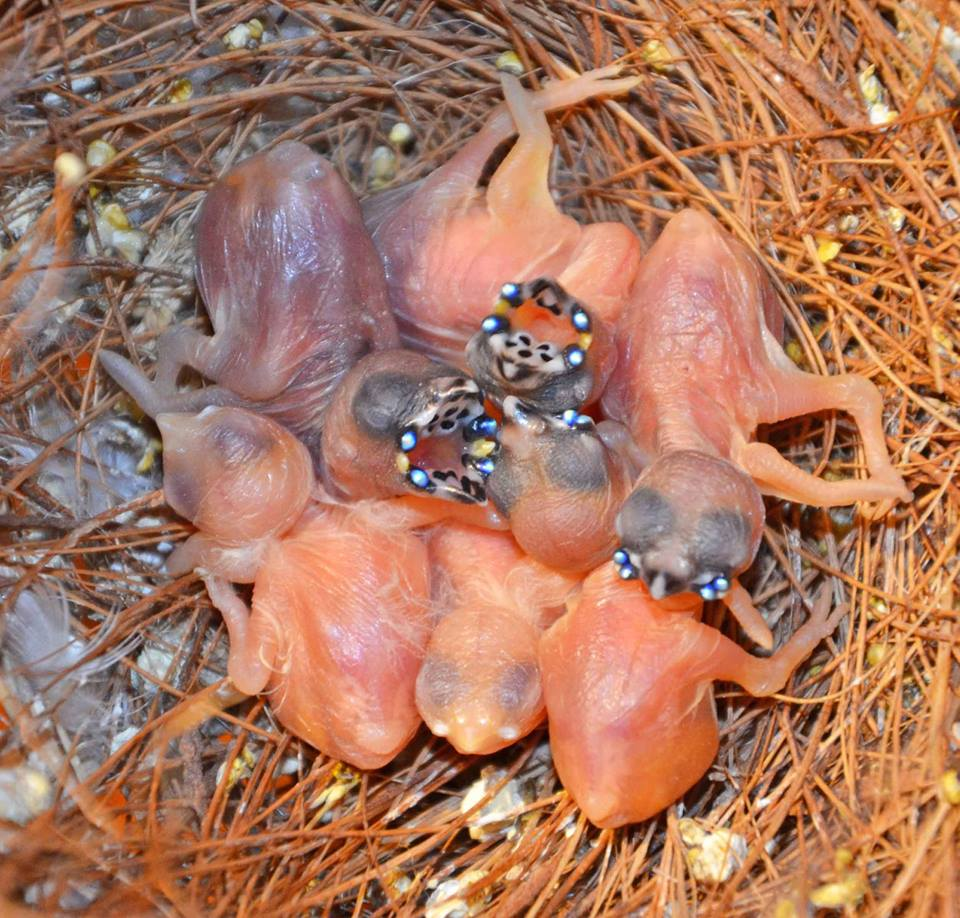
Newly hatched Gouldian finch chicks (note the light-blue opalescent nodules at the edges of the gape)

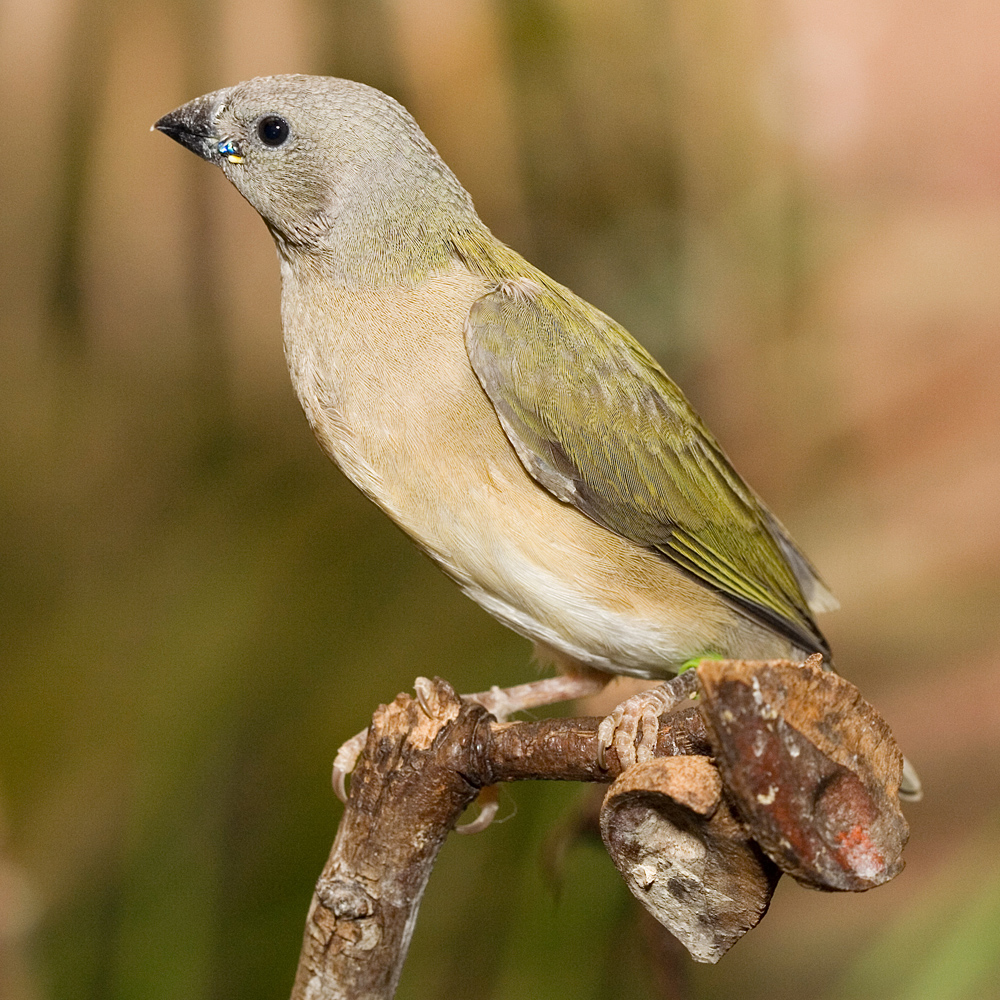
A young Gouldian finch (first day out of the nest), still with the blue nodules on the side of its beak

Gouldian finches will usually make their nests in tree hollows. They usually breed in the early part of the dry season, when there is plenty of food available. When a male is courting a female, he bobs about and ruffles his feathers in an attempt to show off his bright colours. He will expand his chest and fluff out the feathers on his forehead. After mating, the female will lay a clutch of about 4–8 eggs. Both parents help brood the eggs during the daytime, and it is the female who stays on the eggs at night. When the eggs hatch, both parents care for the young. Gouldian finches leave the nest after between 19 and 25 days and are completely independent at 40 days old.

Gouldian finches have brightly coloured gapes and call loudly when the parent birds return so that they are able to find and feed their mouths in the dark nest.

It has been shown that female Gouldian finches from Northern Australia can control the sex of their offspring by choosing mates according to their head colour. A certain amount of genetic incompatibility between black and red-headed birds can result in high mortality (up to 80%) in female offspring when birds of different head colours mate. If the female mates with a finch of different head colour, this genetic incompatibility can be addressed by over-producing sons, up to a ratio of four males to one female. This is one of the first proven instances of birds biasing the sex of their offspring to overcome genetic weaknesses.

== Aviculture ==
Gouldian finches are a popular species in aviculture because of their striking colours and low care requirements. Gouldian finches get along well with other species of grass finch and some other docile species of bird, such as waxbills and parrot finches.

=== Trapping for aviculture ===
In the Kimberley District of Western Australia, where most wild Gouldian finch were trapped for aviculture, it was often reported as one of the more common of the eleven finch species. Until 1977, it was trapped in greater numbers than any other finch. From 1897, when finch trapping started in the Kimberley, it was the most sought after finch by trappers and the most desired by fanciers. Between 1934 and 1939, the Gouldian finch was the most exported single finch species. The Perth Zoo exported 22,064 finches of which 12,509 were Gouldian. Private dealers exported 35,315 finches, of which 14,504 were Gouldian. The number of finches taken in the 1958 finch trapping season was the largest for one year, of the 38,649 finches taken, 11,286 were Gouldian. The last licensed trapping of Gouldian finch in Western Australia was on 15 November 1981. In that year's finch trapping season, of the 23,450 finches taken 1,054 were Gouldian. However, it is now illegal to export these birds from Australia.

== In popular culture ==
The Gouldian finch is used as the basis of the ViewSonic logo.

== Gallery ==
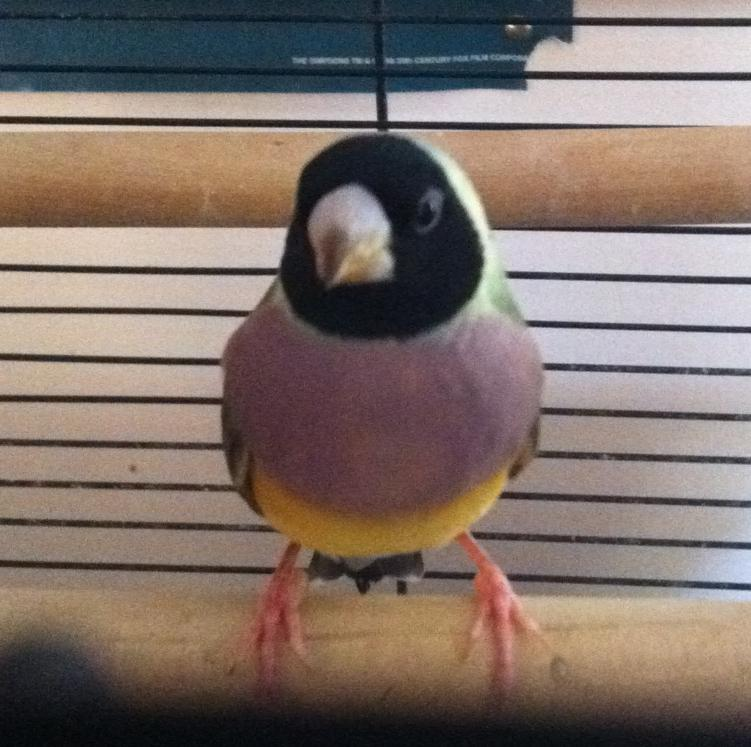
Black-headed female Gouldian finch

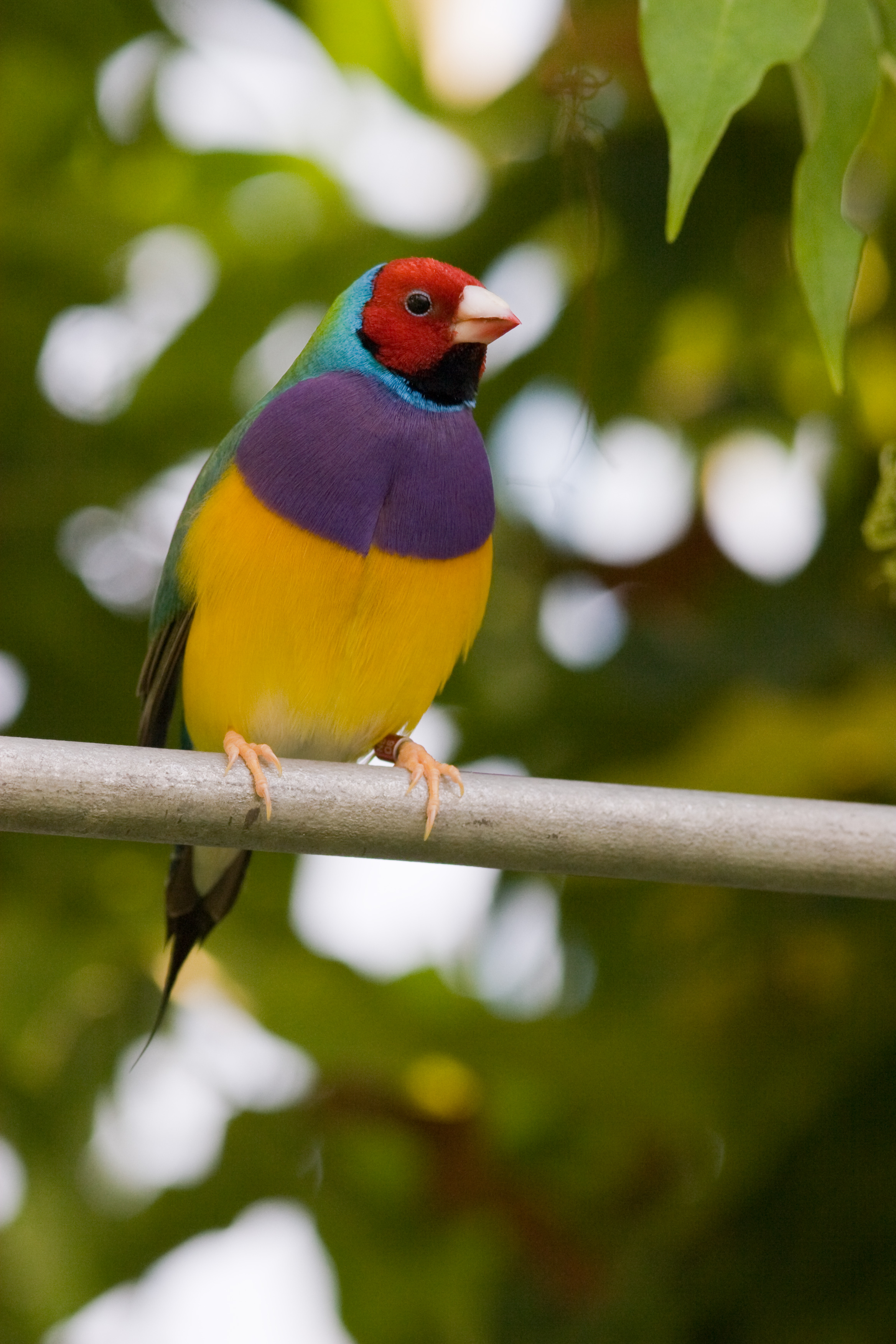
Red headed male Gouldian finch at Artis Zoo, Netherlands

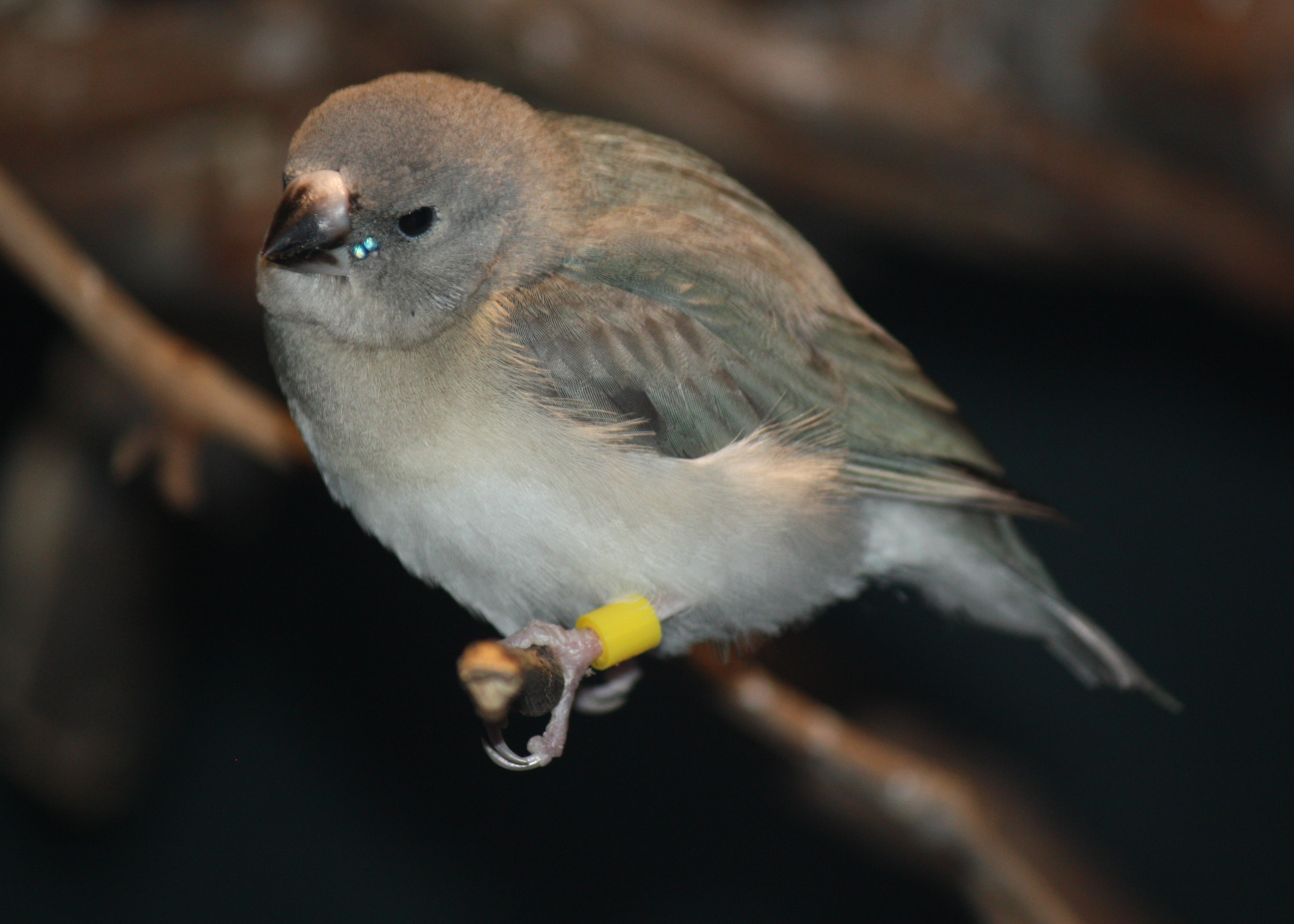
A juvenile at Cincinnati Zoo

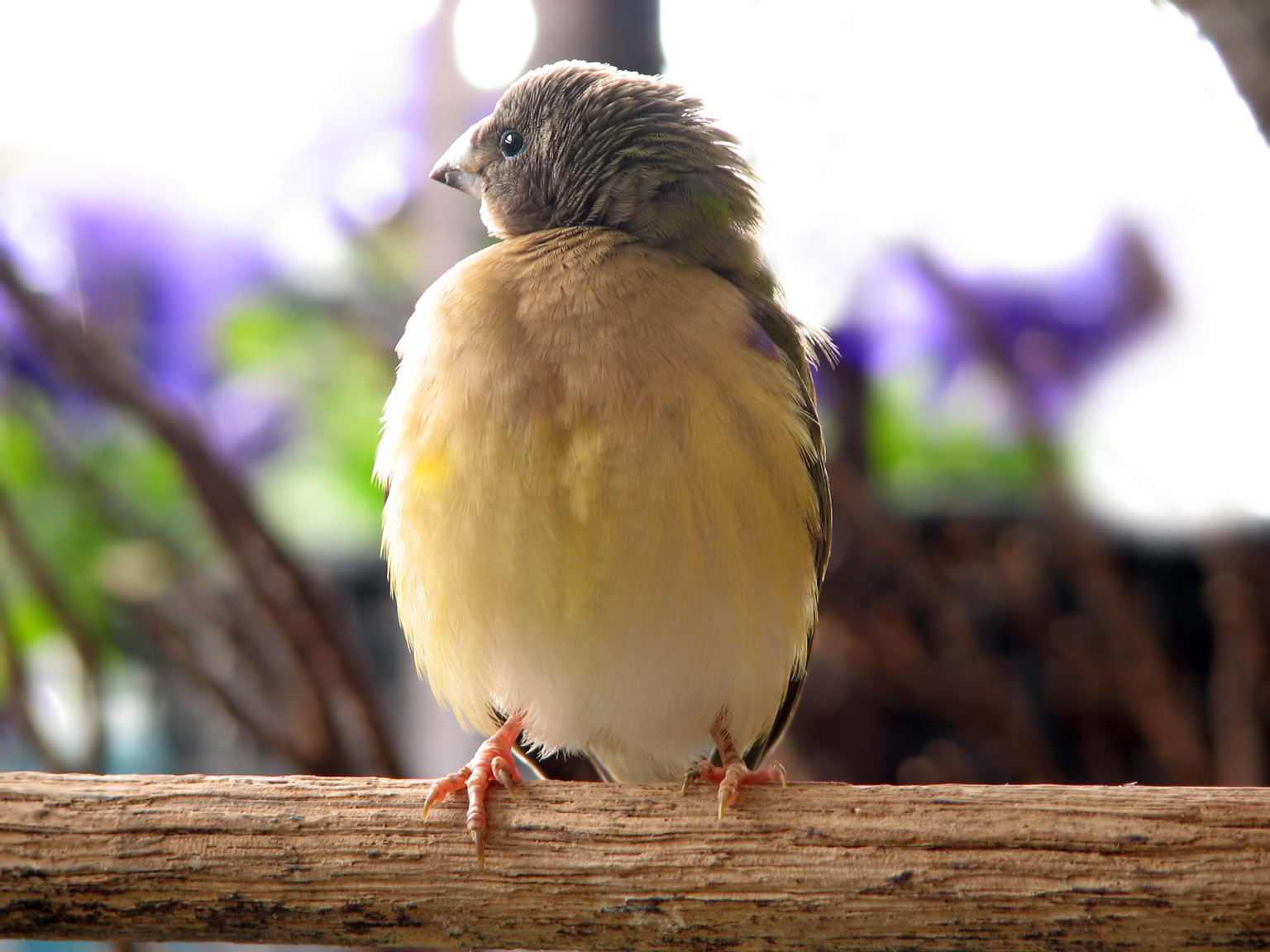
A young Gouldian finch with the beginnings of bright adult plumage

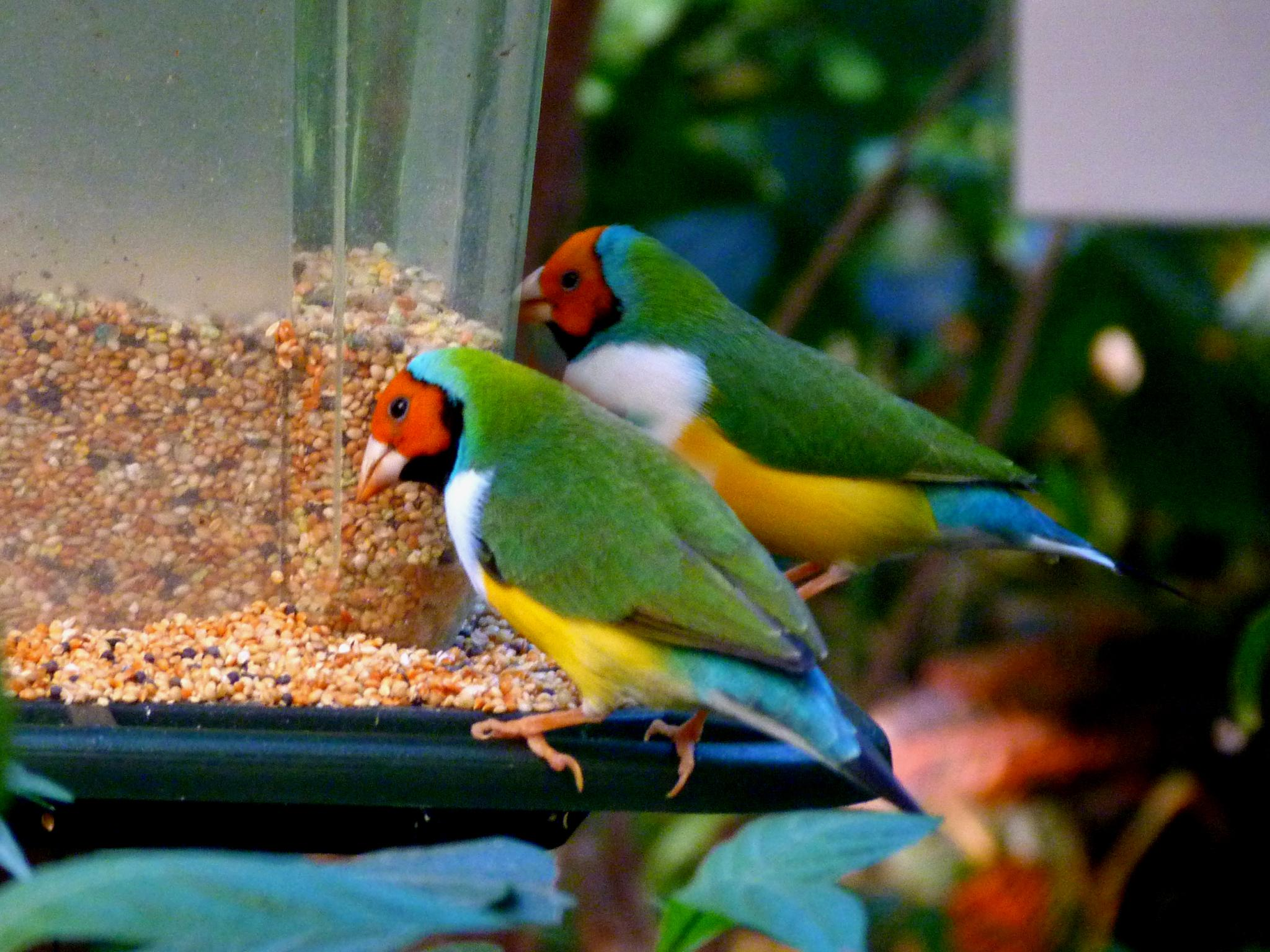
Two Gouldian finches eating birdseed

=== Gouldian finch mutations ===
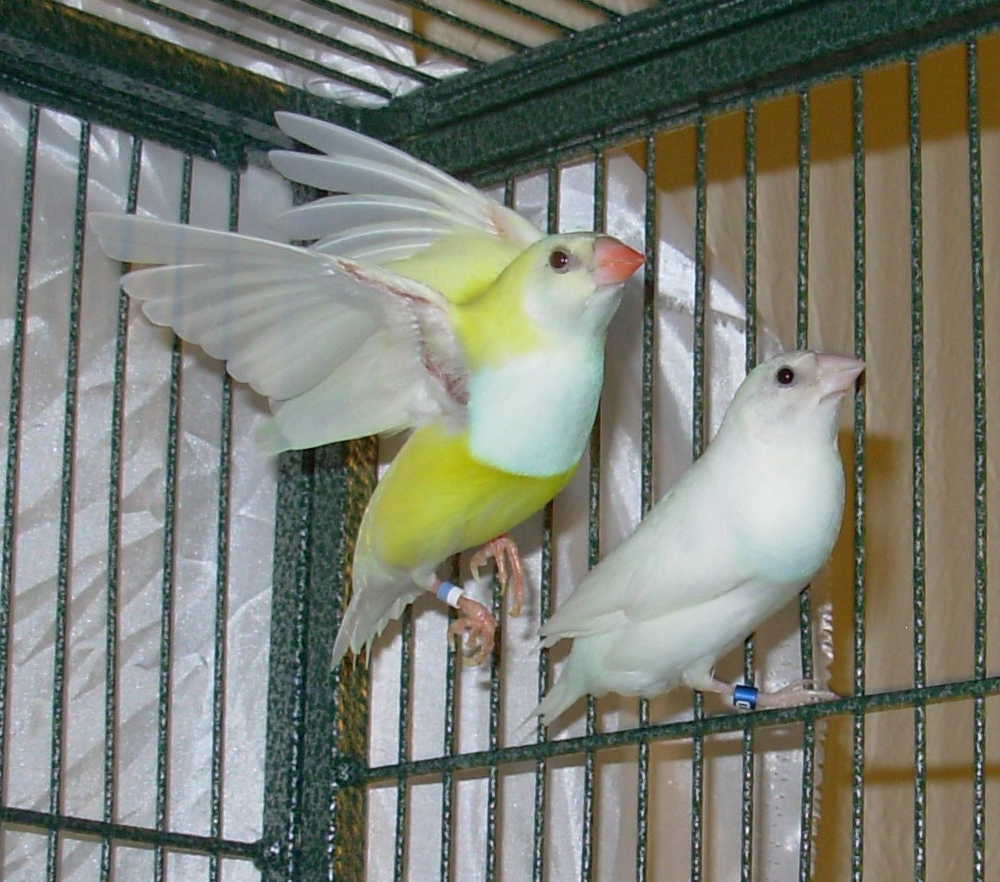
White Gouldian finch and yellow Gouldian finch mutation

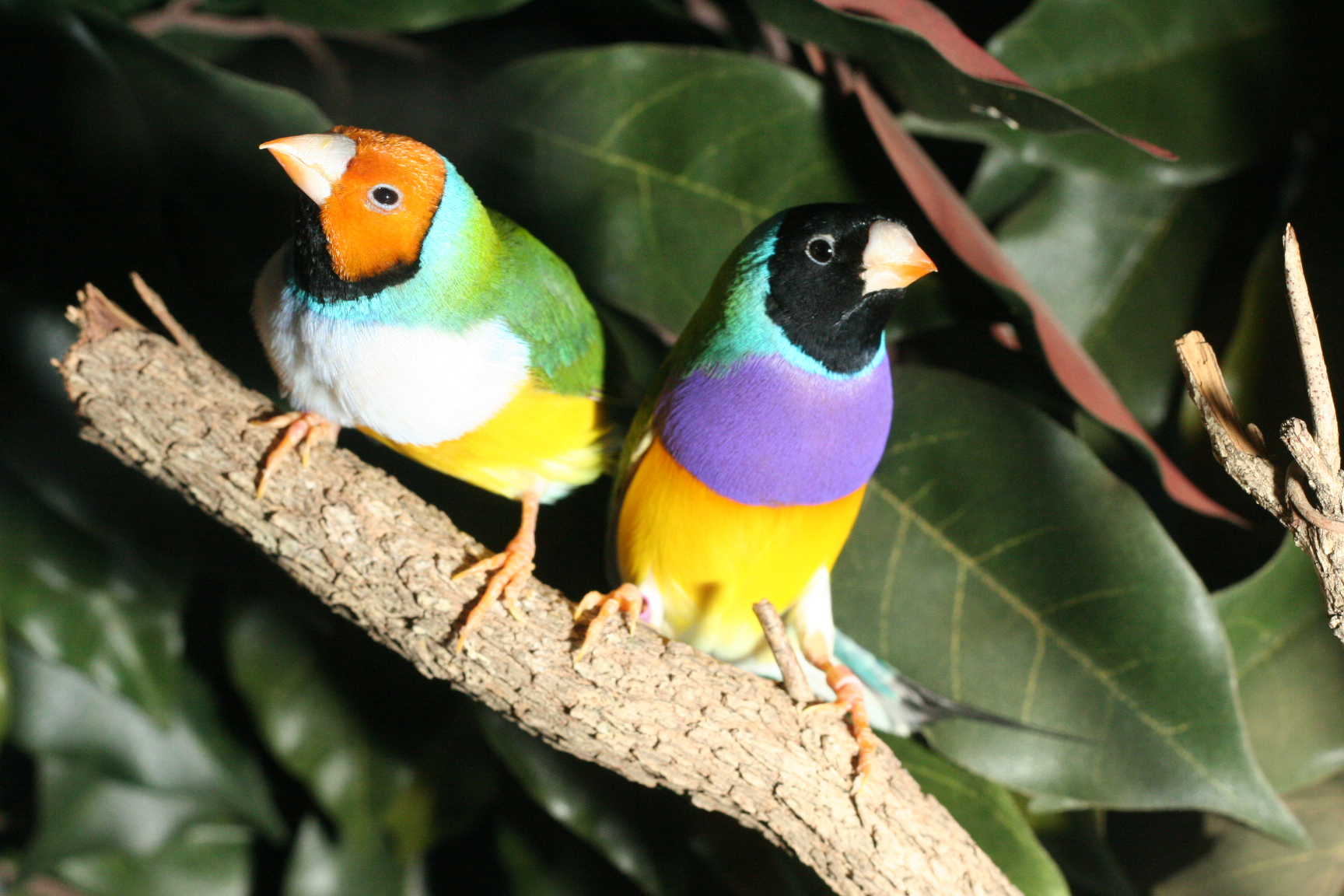
White-breasted yellow-headed Gouldian finch (left) and black-headed male Gouldian finches

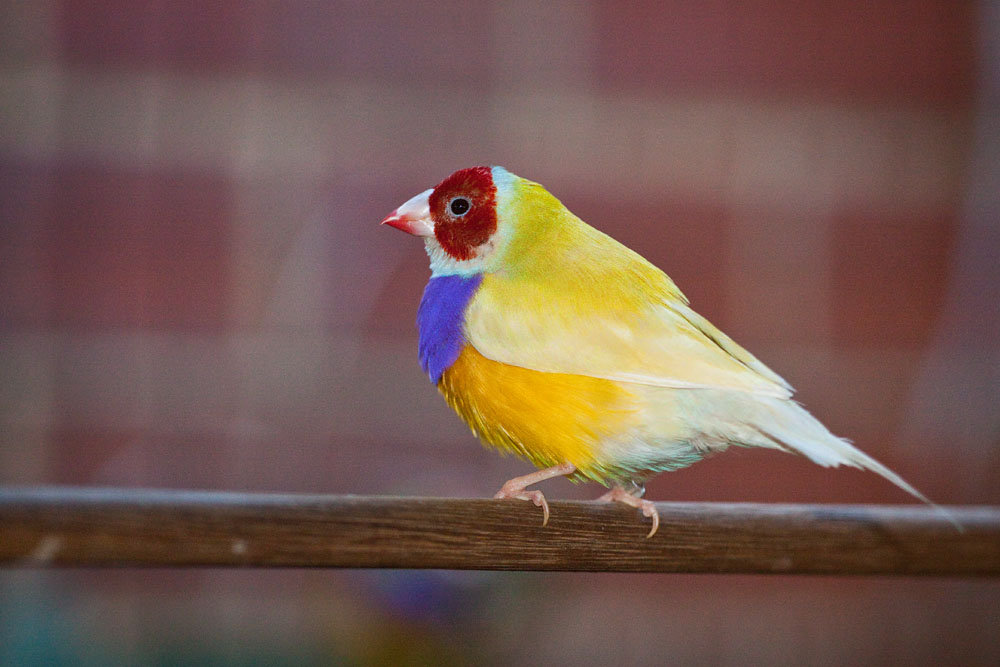
Adult male double factor yellow back Gouldian finch
