= Signalgrass =

Signalgrass is a common name for two closely related genera of grasses:

- Brachiaria
- Urochloa
