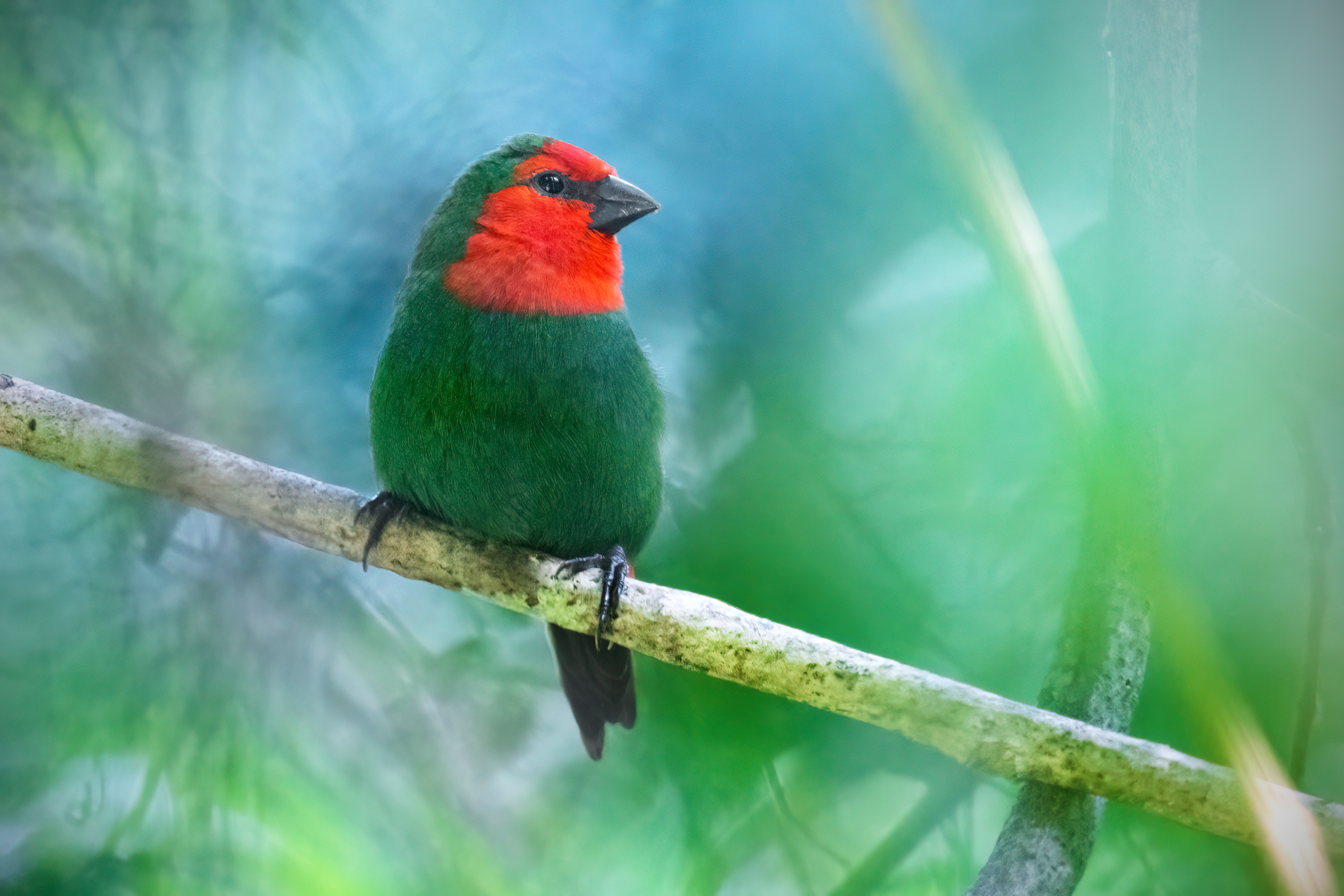

Conservation status
- Least Concern (IUCN 3.1)

Scientific classification
- Kingdom: Animalia
- Phylum: Chordata
- Class: Aves
- Order: Passeriformes
- Family: Estrildidae
- Genus: Erythrura
- Species: E. psittacea

Binomial name
- Erythrura psittacea (Gmelin, JF, 1789)
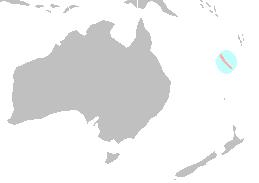

= Red-throated parrotfinch =

Species of bird

The red-throated parrotfinch (Erythrura psittacea) is a species of estrildid finch found in New Caledonia. It has an estimated global extent of occurrence of 20,000 to 50,000 km^{2}.

It is found in both subtropical or tropical moist lowland forest and shrubland habitats. The IUCN has classified the species as being of least concern.

== Taxonomy ==
The red-throated parrotfinch was formally described in 1789 by the German naturalist Johann Friedrich Gmelin in his revised and expanded edition of Carl Linnaeus's Systema Naturae. He placed it with the finches in the genus Fringilla and coined the binomial name Fringilla psittacea. The specific epithet is Modern Latin for "parrot-like". Gmelin based his account on the "parrot finch" that had been described and illustrated in 1783 by the English ornithologist John Latham in his multi-volume work A General Synopsis of Birds. Latham's had access to a specimen that had been shot by the German naturalist Johann Reinhold Forster in New Caledonia. Forster had accompanied James Cook on his second voyage to the Pacific Ocean. The red-throated parrotfinch is now one of 12 parrotfinches placed in the genus Erythrura that was introduced in 1837 by the English naturalist William Swainson. The species is monotypic: no subspecies are recognised.
