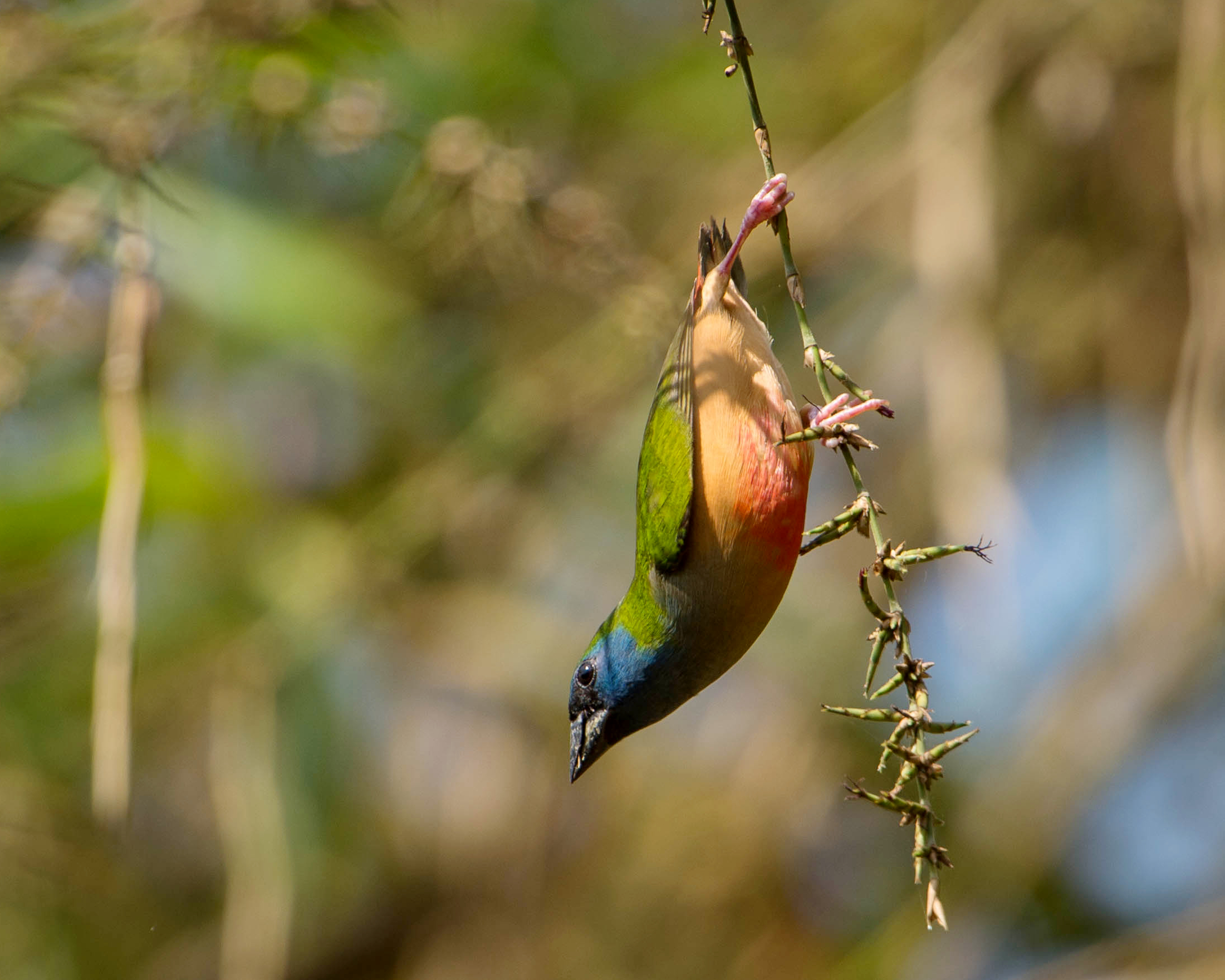

Conservation status
- Least Concern (IUCN 3.1)

Scientific classification
- Kingdom: Animalia
- Phylum: Chordata
- Class: Aves
- Order: Passeriformes
- Family: Estrildidae
- Genus: Erythrura
- Species: E. prasina

Binomial name
- Erythrura prasina (Sparrman, 1788)

= Pin-tailed parrotfinch =

Species of bird

The pin-tailed parrotfinch (Erythrura prasina) is a common species of estrildid finch found in Southeast Asia: Malaysia, Brunei, Cambodia, Indonesia, Laos, Burma, Vietnam, Thailand and China. It has an estimated global extent of occurrence of 10,000,000 km^{2}.

It is found in subtropical/tropical in both montane and lowland moist forest, and is also found in bamboo thickets and rice plantations. Flocks of this species can do great damage to rice crops, and in parts of its range it is classed as a pest. The IUCN has classified the species as being of least concern. It is a popular cage bird.

On August 2, 2007, scientists on an expedition to the upper ranges of Mount Mantalingahan in southern Palawan province in the Philippines announced the discovery, with other animals, of the pin-tailed parrot finch, according to Dr. Lawrence Heaney, a biologist from the Chicago Field Museum.
