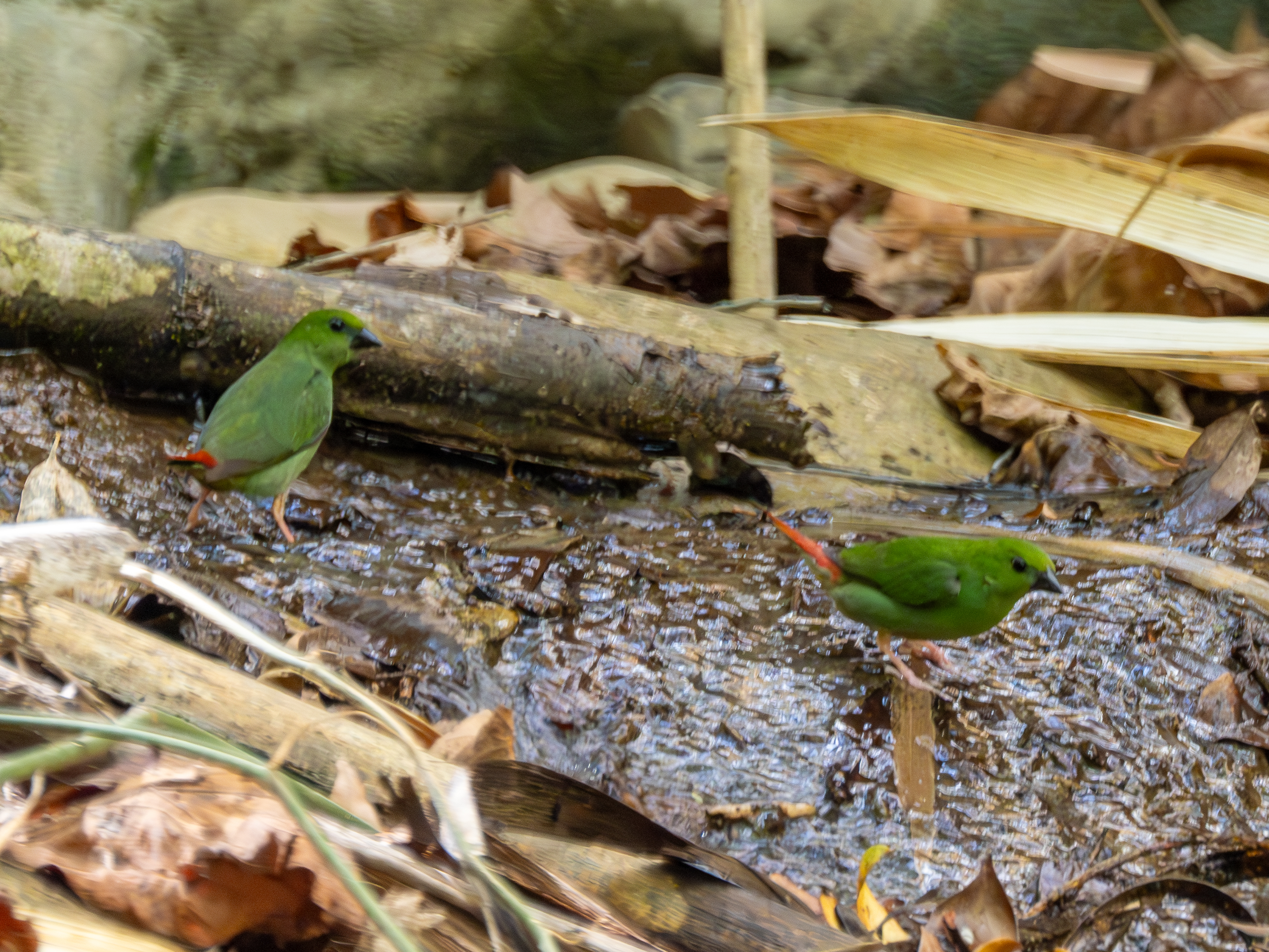

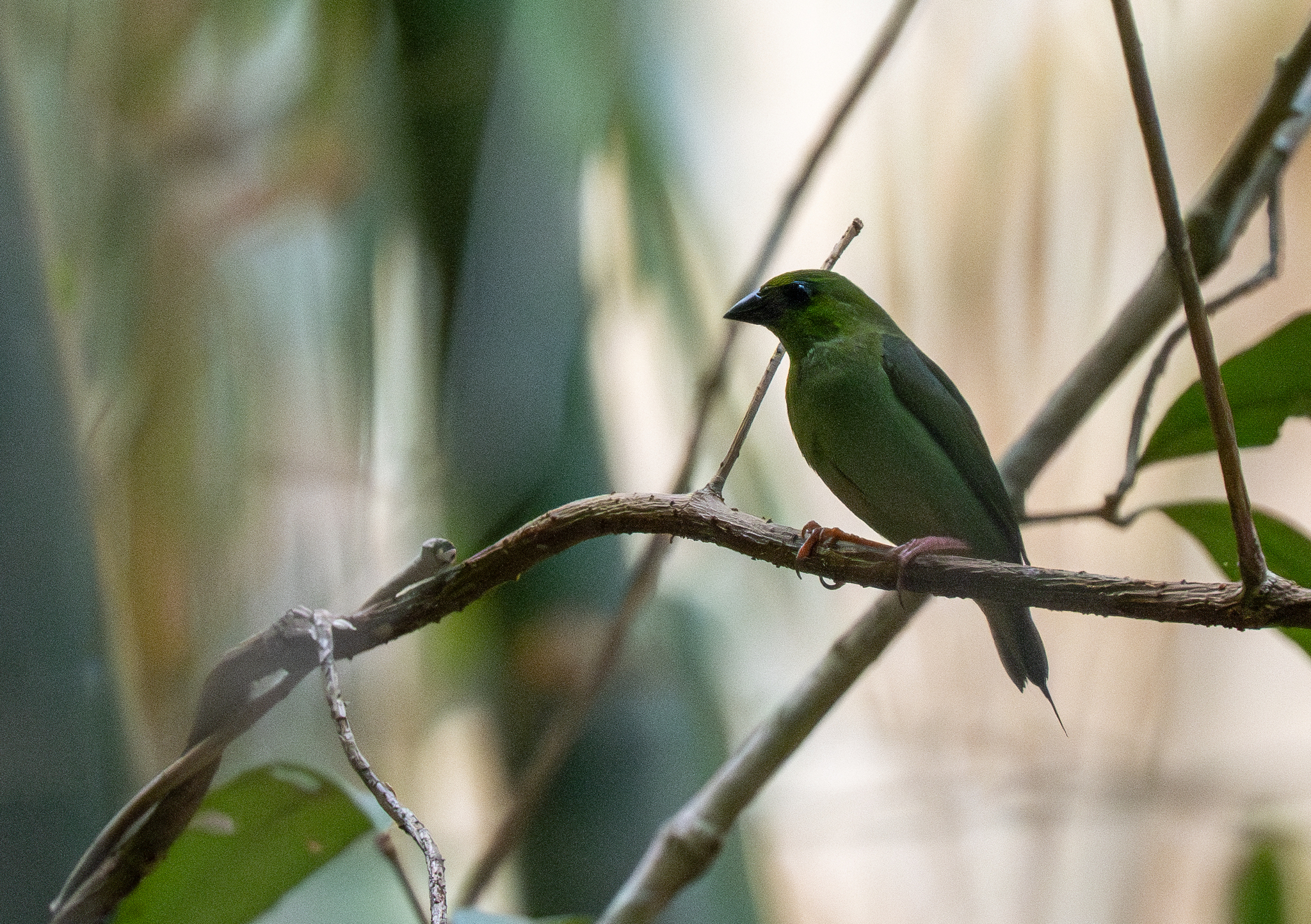
- Juvenile

Conservation status
- Least Concern (IUCN 3.1)

Scientific classification
- Kingdom: Animalia
- Phylum: Chordata
- Class: Aves
- Order: Passeriformes
- Family: Estrildidae
- Genus: Erythrura
- Species: E. viridifacies

Binomial name
- Erythrura viridifacies Hachisuka & Delacour, 1937

= Green-faced parrotfinch =

Species of bird

The green-faced parrotfinch (Erythrura viridifacies) is a rare species of estrildid finch found in northern Philippines, on Luzon, Mindoro, Panay, Negros and Cebu islands. It is an elusive and nomadic bird with mostly green plummage with a bright red vent and tail, rarely seen but large flocks of up to 1,000 birds have been reported feeding on bamboo flowers. Its local name is mayang-kawayan in Tagalog which roughly translates to bamboo sparrow due to its association with bamboo flowering.

== Description ==
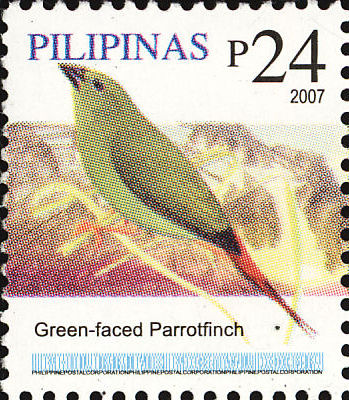
A Philippine stamp with an illustration of the Green-faced parrotfinch

The green-faced parrotfinch is approximately 12–13 centimetres (4.7–5.1 in) long. This species green plumage except for its bright red uppertail-coverts and tail and darker fringes to the primaries. It has a long pointed tail. The female is slightly shorter and shows buff on the lower belly and vent. Both sexes have a large, dark bill. The green-faced parrotfinch makes a short, high-pitched tsit tsit, chattering and grating notes.

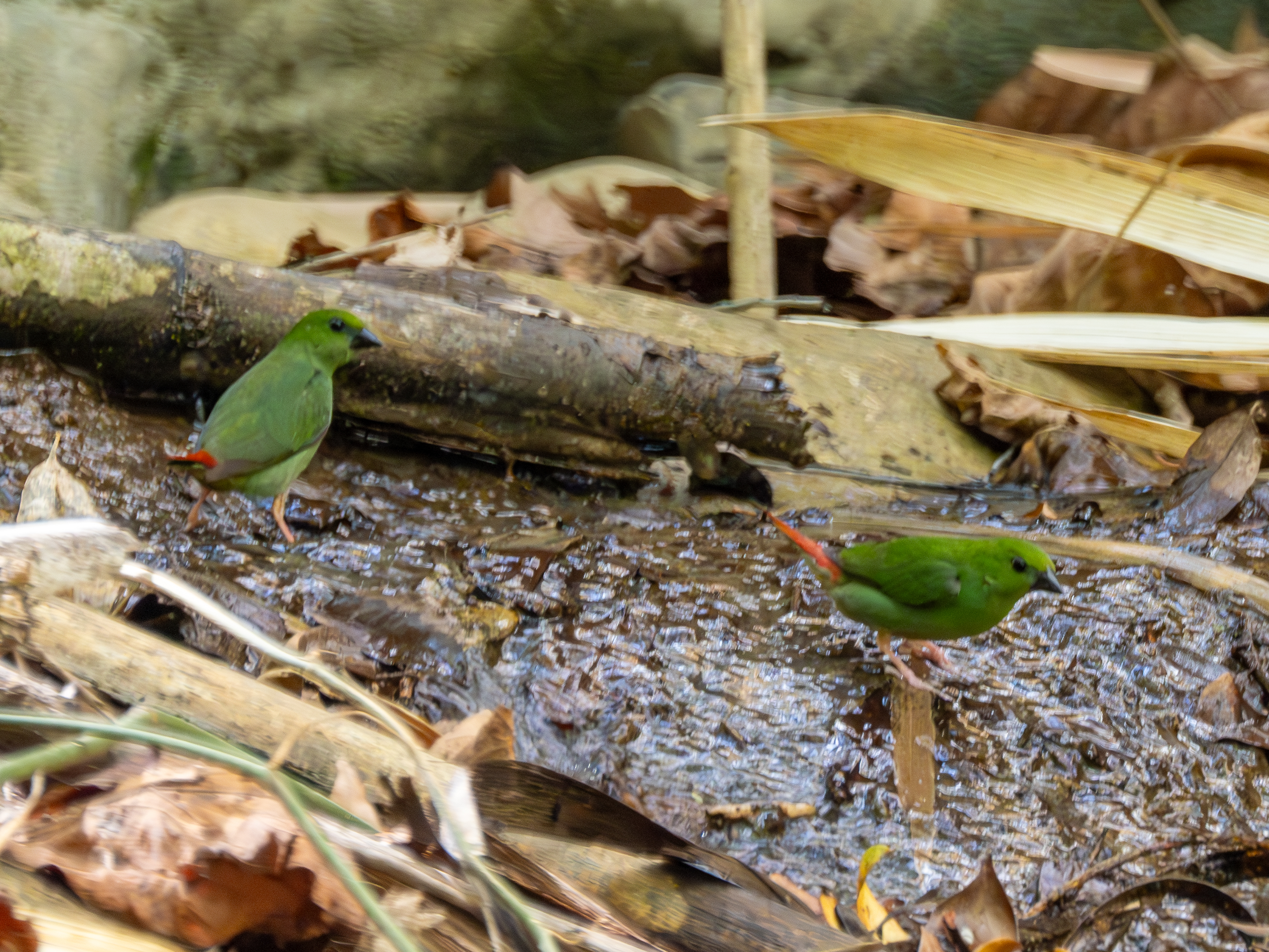
In Rizal

== Ecology and behavior ==
It is irruptive, visiting flowering bamboos even in the lowlands and eating its seeds. During bamboo blooms, flocks as many as one thousand birds have been observed. It is believed to be nomadic. Otherwise, not much else is known about this bird, where it breeds, and its dispersive qualities and if they travel across islands. It was only discovered on Cebu in 2000 and then in Mindoro in 2013.

In 2024, for multiple weeks, a small group of 8 birds was observed in Rizal picking up snails in streams and dipping them in the water. It is unknown if the parrotfinches used these snails to drink or if they fed on them.

== Habitat and Conservation Status ==
It inhabits tropical moist montane forest, forest edge and even savannah, often above 1,000 meters above sea level, but is occasionally found in the lowlands. It is usually found together with flowering or seeding bamboos, which are its food supply. Its true stronghold, if any, is unknown but most records have been in Luzon.

As of 2025, this species was downlisted by the IUCN Red List to a Least-concern species with the population trend not known. This species was previously listed as a Vulnerable species,

The cage-bird trade in the 1930s to the 1980s has also affected its population as large numbers of green-faced parrotfinch in many districts of Manila have been caught and exported to the United States. Despite a large number of birds entering the avicultural scene in the 1980s, no captive breeding has occurred.

This species is currently conserved in two protected areas, the Northern Sierra Madre Natural Park and Bataan Natural Park/Subic Bay but actual enforcement is lax. Also, due to its nomadic habits, occurrence in protected areas does not necessarily confer continuous protection.

Proposed conservation actions include more fieldwork and observations to properly understand its true range and disperasal habits. Its also proposed that more research be conducted on its diet and ecology of the bamboos it feeds on and that areas that support parrotfinch and its favored bamboo species.
