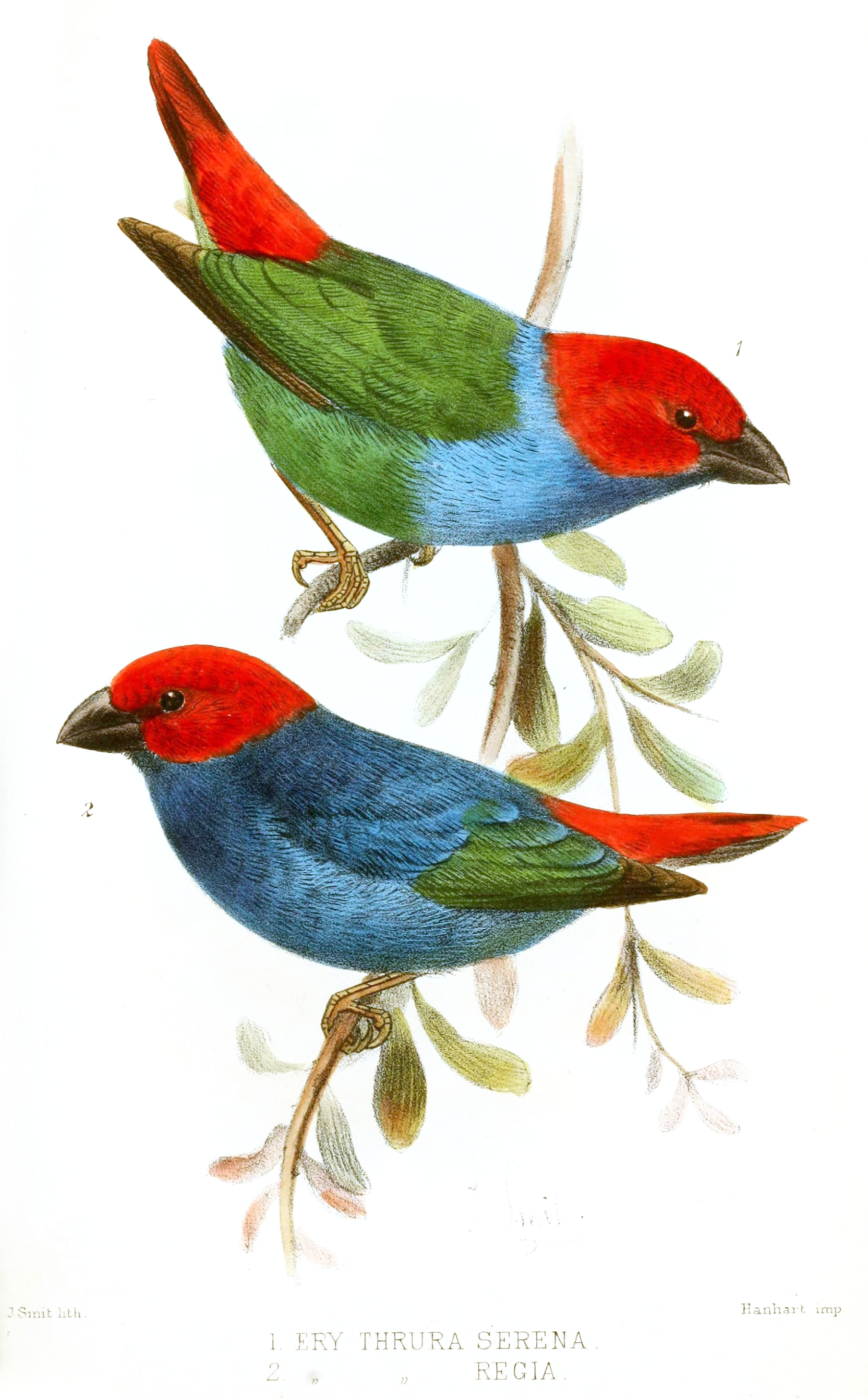
- Illustration (above) with royal parrotfinch

Conservation status
- Near Threatened (IUCN 3.1)

Scientific classification
- Kingdom: Animalia
- Phylum: Chordata
- Class: Aves
- Order: Passeriformes
- Family: Estrildidae
- Genus: Erythrura
- Species: E. cyaneovirens

Binomial name
- Erythrura cyaneovirens (Peale, 1849)

= Red-headed parrotfinch =

Species of bird

The red-headed parrotfinch (Erythrura cyaneovirens) (Segaula) is a common species of estrildid finch found in Samoa. It has an estimated global extent of occurrence of 20,000 to 50,000 km^{2}. It is found in subtropical/tropical lowland moist forest and eats insects and fruit, foraging in the canopy of large trees. Previously classified as near-threatened due to its small estimated population and habitat loss, it is now classified as a Least-concern species.

== Taxonomy ==
The Red-headed parrotfinch was formally described in 1848 or 1849 by American naturalist Titian Peale in volume VIII of the report of the United States Exploring Expedition. He placed it with Darwin's finches in the genus Geospiza and coined the binomial name Geospiza cyaneovirens. He based his description on samples and observations taken on Upolu during the expedition. The red-headed parrotfinch is now one of 12 parrotfinches placed in the genus Erythrura that was introduced in 1837 by the English naturalist William Swainson.

There are 2 recognised subspecies:

- E. c. gaughrani duPont, 1972
- E. c. cyaneovirens Peale, 1849

Taxonomists disagree on whether the Royal parrotfinch of Vanuatu is a standalone species or a subspecies. As of 2026, the HBW/IUCN, Clements, and AviList taxonomies consider it a subspecies, E. c. regia. IOC taxonomy retains it as a separate species, Erythrura regia.

== Description ==
A small bird, 10cm long, with blue-green upperparts, green wings, a red tail, and red face.

It breeds in January-April, and July and August, building an elliptical or ball-like nest and laying a clutch of three to four eggs.
