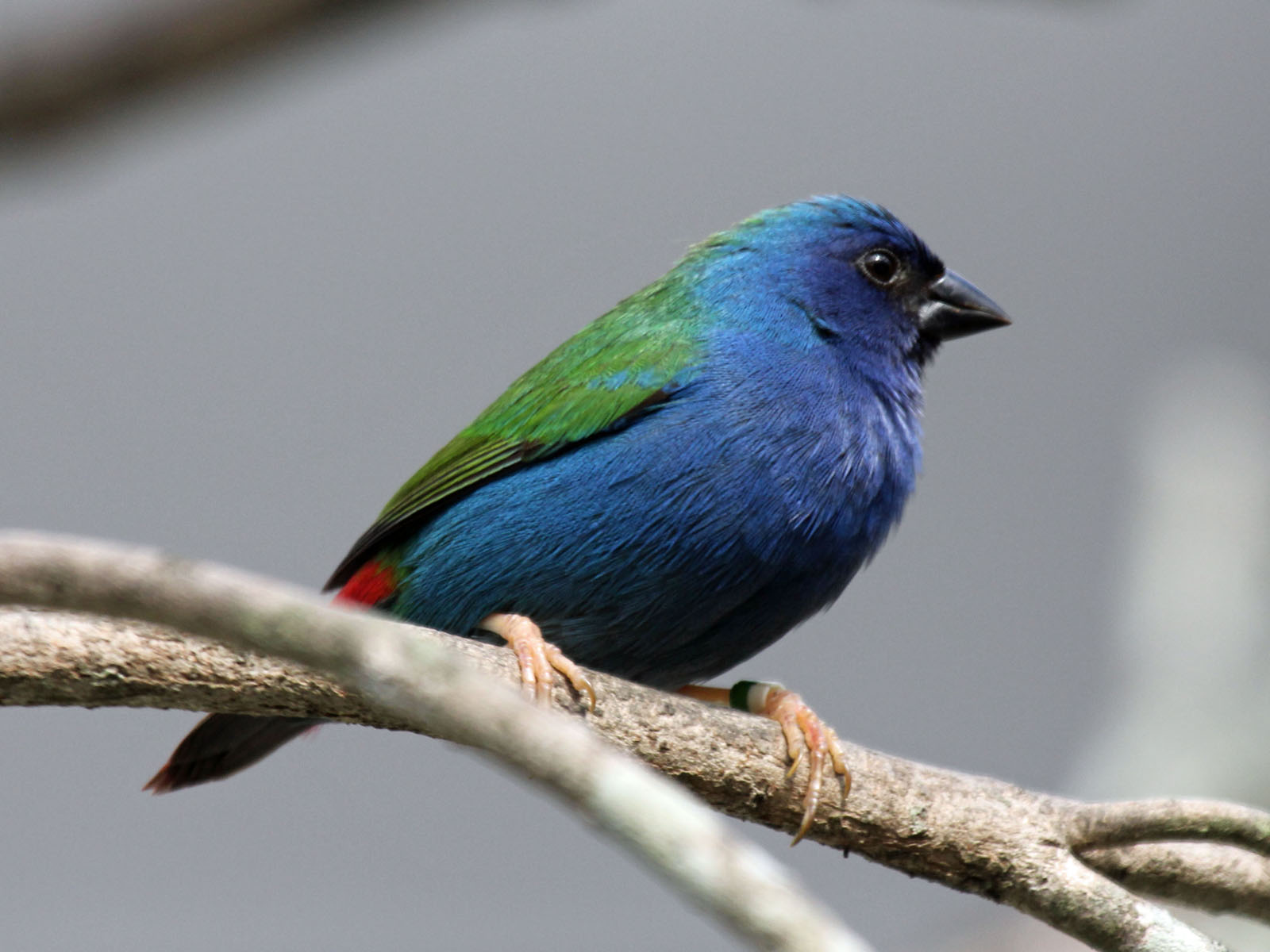

Conservation status
- Least Concern (IUCN 3.1)

Scientific classification
- Kingdom: Animalia
- Phylum: Chordata
- Class: Aves
- Order: Passeriformes
- Family: Estrildidae
- Genus: Erythrura
- Species: E. tricolor

Binomial name
- Erythrura tricolor (Vieillot, 1817)

= Tricolored parrotfinch =

Species of bird

The tricolored parrotfinch (Erythrura tricolor) is a species of estrildid finch found in Timor and the southern Moluccas. It has an estimated global extent of occurrence of 20,000 to 50,000 km^{2}.

It is found in subtropical/tropical dry forest and dry savannah. The IUCN has classified the species as being of least concern.
