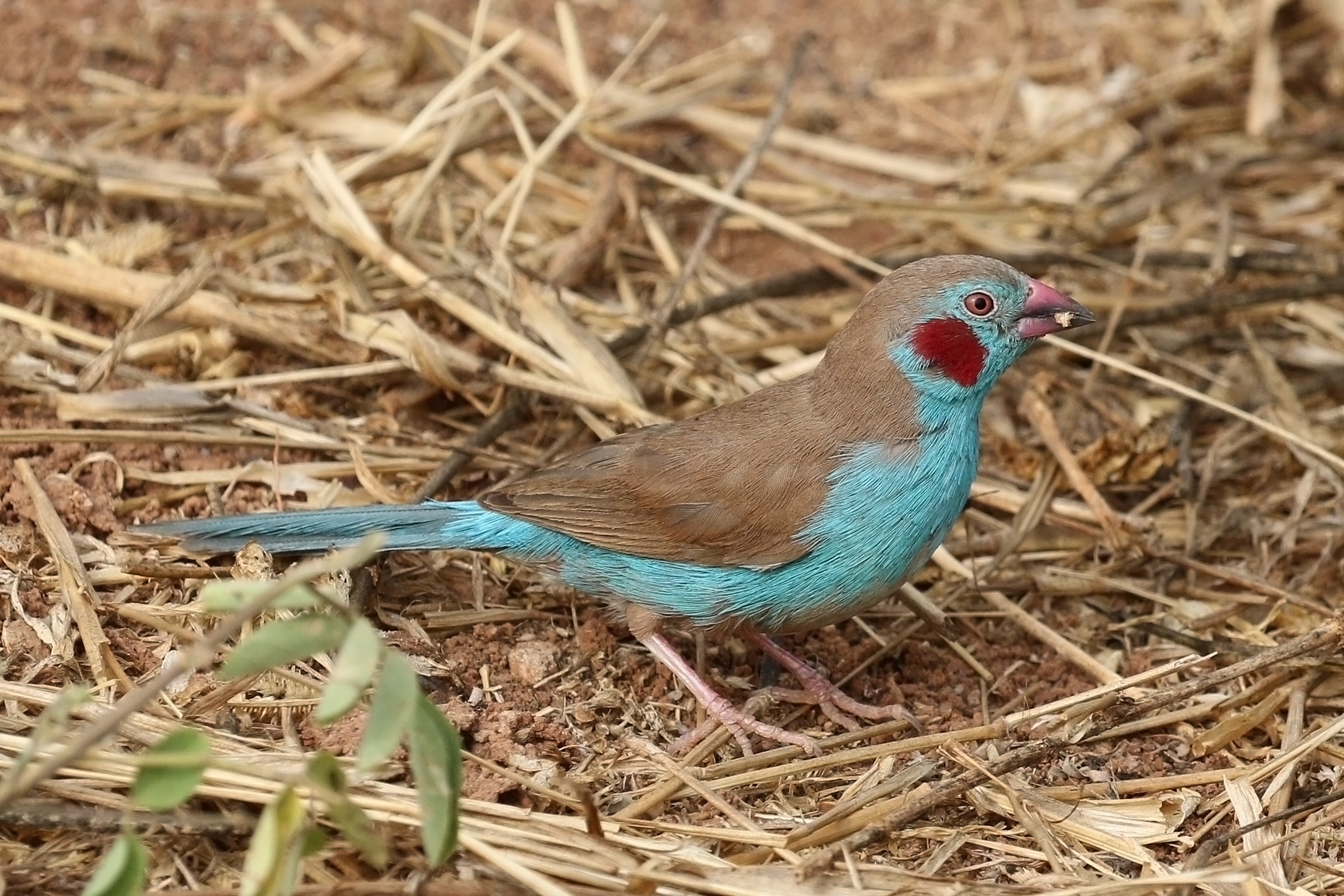
- male U. b. bengalus
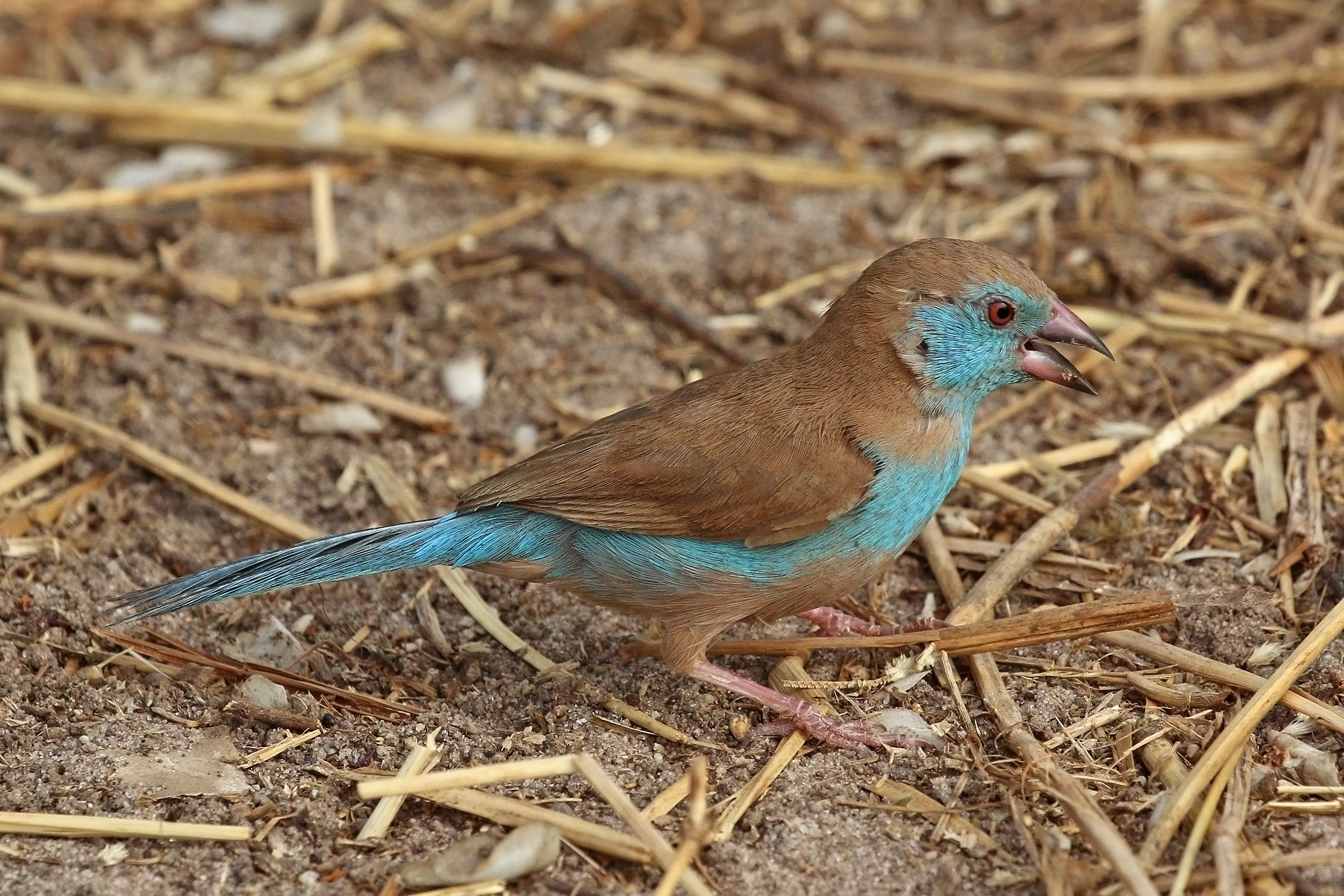
- female U. b. bengalus both in Gambia

Conservation status
- Least Concern (IUCN 3.1)

Scientific classification
- Kingdom: Animalia
- Phylum: Chordata
- Class: Aves
- Order: Passeriformes
- Family: Estrildidae
- Genus: Uraeginthus
- Species: U. bengalus

Binomial name
- Uraeginthus bengalus (Linnaeus, 1766)

= Red-cheeked cordon-bleu =

Species of bird

The red-cheeked cordon-bleu or red-cheeked cordonbleu (Uraeginthus bengalus) is a small passerine bird in the family Estrildidae. This estrildid finch is a resident breeding bird in drier regions of tropical Sub-Saharan Africa. Red-cheeked cordon-bleu has an estimated global extent of occurrence of 7,700,000 km^{2}.

== Taxonomy ==
In 1760 the French zoologist Mathurin Jacques Brisson included a description of the red-cheeked cordon-bleu in his Ornithologie based on a specimen that he mistakenly believed had been collected in Bengal. He used the French name Le Bengali and the Latin Bengalus. Although Brisson coined Latin names, these do not conform to the binomial system and are not recognised by the International Commission on Zoological Nomenclature. When in 1766 the Swedish naturalist Carl Linnaeus updated his Systema Naturae for the twelfth edition, he added 240 species that had been previously described by Brisson. One of these was the red-cheeked cordon-bleu. Linnaeus included a brief description, coined the binomial name Fringilla bengalus and cited Brisson's work. The specific name bengalus is based on the erroneous belief that the species came from Bengal. The type location was subsequently designated as Senegal. The species is now placed in the genus Uraeginthus that was introduced by the German ornithologist Jean Cabanis in 1851.

The red-cheeked cordon-bleu, the blue-capped cordon-bleu, and the blue waxbill form a species group within the genus. Further, the red-cheeked cordon-bleu may form a superspecies with the blue waxbill, with which it shares similar habitats.

There are four subspecies, which differ primarily in the amount of blue on the face and underparts of the females.

- U. b. bengalus (Linnaeus, 1766) – south Mauritania to Guinea and east to Ethiopia, Uganda and west Kenya
- U. b. brunneigularis Mearns, 1911 – south Somalia, central and east Kenya and northeast Tanzania
- U. b. ugogensis Reichenow, 1911 – south Kenya and north, west and central Tanzania
- U. b. katangae Vincent, 1934 – northeast Angola, south Democratic Republic of the Congo and north Zambia

== Description ==
Like other members of its genus, the red-cheeked cordon-bleu is a very small finch, measuring only 12.5–13 cm (4.9–5.1 in) in length. It weighs 9.9 g (0.35 oz) on average, with known extremes in wild populations ranging from 8.9–11 g (0.31–0.39 oz). The adult male has a blue continuous coloration from its face to its breast and flanks, then onto its rump and to the tip of its long, thin, pointed tail. The wings are light brown as the bottom of the belly. There is a red patch on each cheek, but this can rarely appear orange or even yellow. Females are similar but duller, and lack the cheek spot. Immature birds are like the female, but with blue restricted to the face and throat.

=== Voice ===
Its contact call is a thin, high-pitched piping, often repeated, and variously transcribed as siii siii or tsee tsee. The song is more complex, consisting of 4–6 high-pitched notes, the last of which is longer, lower and more burry. Described as "rhythmic but lazy", it has been transcribed as wit-sit-diddley-diddley-ee-ee. Unlike many other passerines, but like all cordon-bleu species, female red-cheeked cordon-bleus sing; they also help to defend a small area around their nest site. Their song is less complex than that of the males, and they sing less frequently. Female song peaks primarily before egg-laying, and is thought to help with pair bond maintenance or breeding synchronization.

== Habitat and range ==
The red-cheeked cordon-bleu is common and widespread across much of central and eastern Africa. Its range stretches from the West African countries of Senegal, Gambia and southwestern Mauritania east through southern Mali, southern Niger, southern Chad and southern Sudan to Ethiopia and northwestern and southwestern Somalia, and then south to southern Democratic Republic of the Congo, eastern Angola, northern and western Zambia, southern Tanzania and northern Mozambique. It has also been introduced to the Hawaiian Islands of Hawaii and Oahu. It has been found one time (in 1924) on Cape Verde and was recorded in the Maadi area in northern Egypt during the mid-1960s; the latter birds may have been escaped cage birds, as there have been no records since. It has been photographed in the Los Angeles Area (5/19/20) as well.

It is found in all habitats except forest interiors, at elevations ranging from sea level to 2,430 m (7,970 ft).

== Behaviour ==
It is frequently seen at open dry grassland and savanna habitats as well as around human habitation.

=== Feeding ===
The red-cheeked cordon-bleu is a granivore, feeding principally on grass seeds, but also on millet and other small seeds. It is also known to feed sporadically on beeswax. Larger granivores, such as the pin-tailed whydah will chase cordon-bleus from food sources, limiting the feeding opportunities of the smaller birds and affecting their foraging success.

=== Breeding ===
The nest is a large domed grass structure with a side entrance in a tree, bush or thatch into which 4–5 white eggs are laid.

== Aviculture ==
The red-cheeked cordon-bleu is reported to be "among the most popular exotic finches". While it has no special housing requirements, its habit of roosting on open branches (rather than in a nest or other protected area) makes it sensitive to low temperatures. During the breeding season, captive males become very aggressive towards each other, and birds disturbed during incubation will typically leave the nest.

== Gallery ==
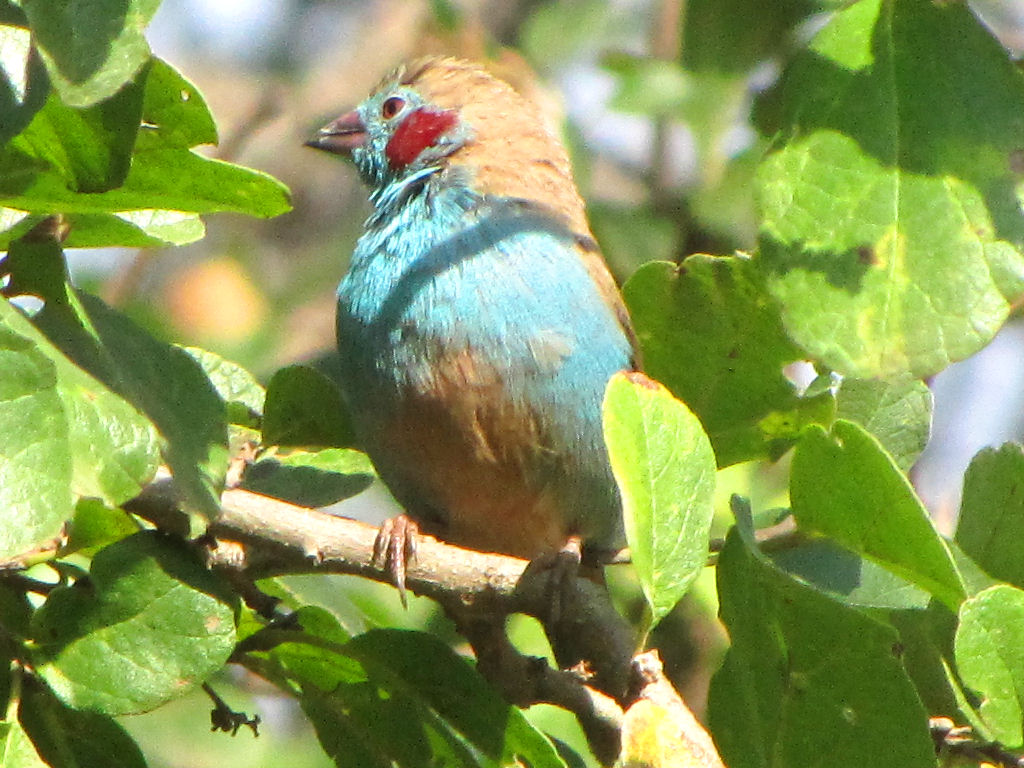
Ngorongoro National Park, Tanzania

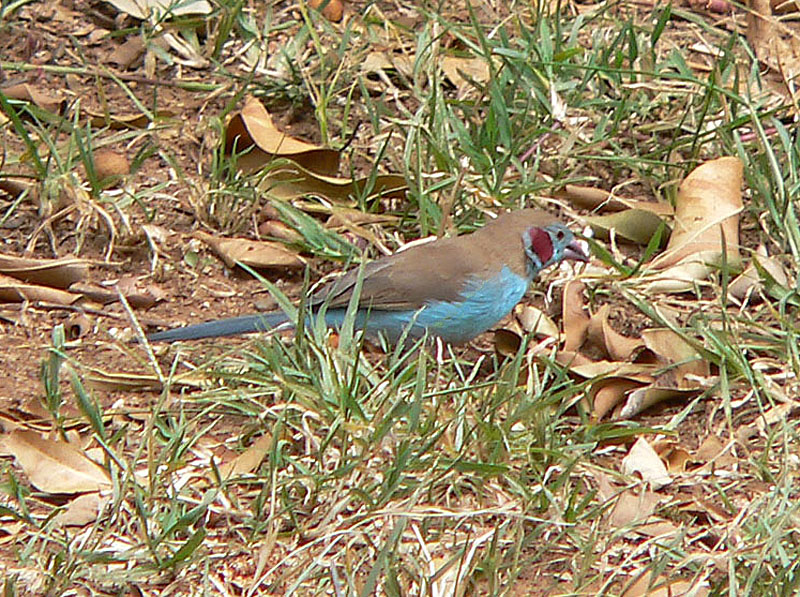
Nanyuki, Kenya

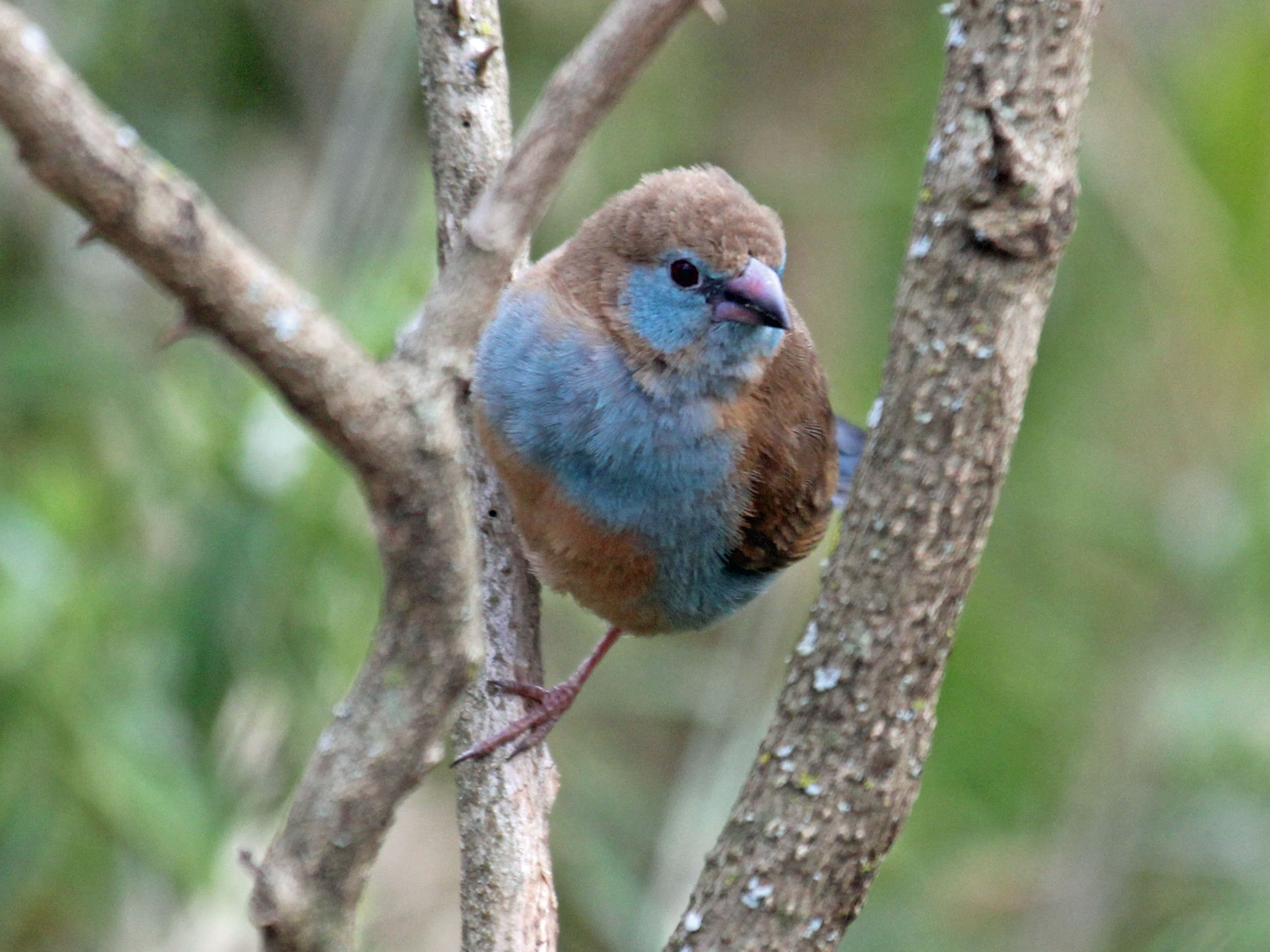
Female in Kenya
