= B. juncea =

B. juncea may refer to:

- Baccharis juncea, a New World plant
- Baumea juncea, a rhizomatous herb
- Bebbia juncea, an aromatic shrub
- Belonogaster juncea, a paper wasp
- Bouteloua juncea, a true grass
- Brassica juncea, a mustard plant
