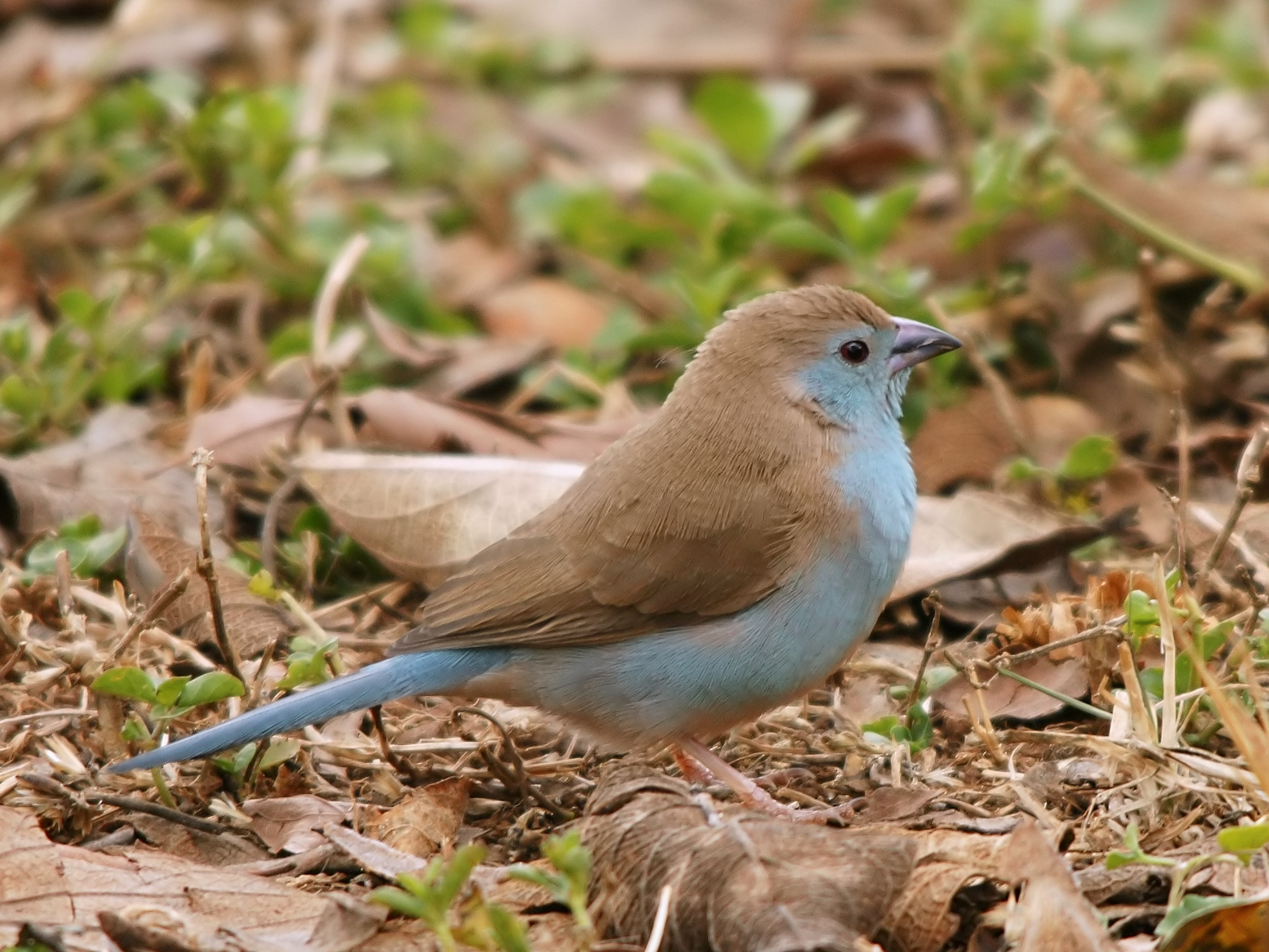

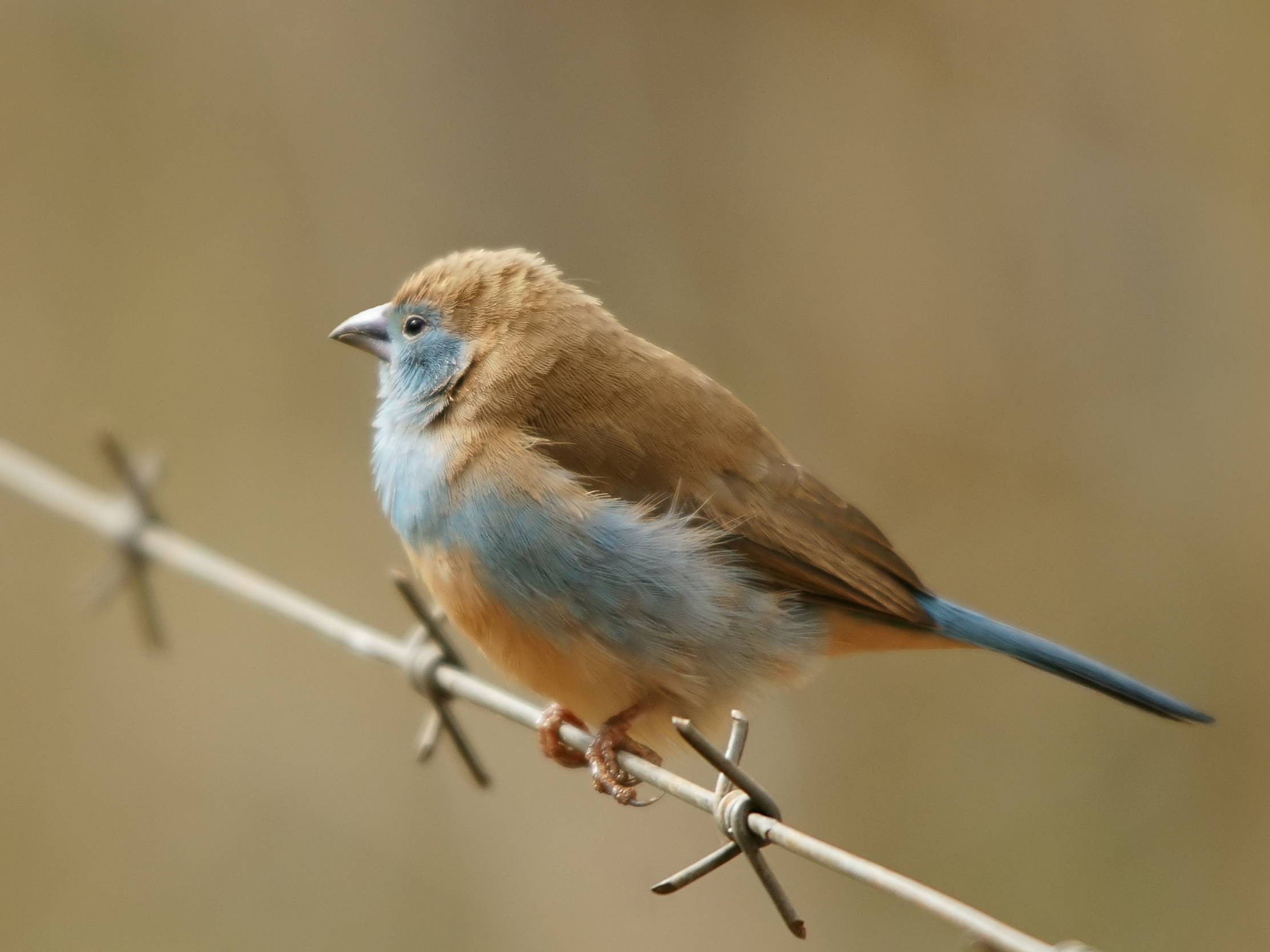
- Male above and female below

Conservation status
- Least Concern (IUCN 3.1)

Scientific classification
- Kingdom: Animalia
- Phylum: Chordata
- Class: Aves
- Order: Passeriformes
- Family: Estrildidae
- Genus: Uraeginthus
- Species: U. angolensis

Binomial name
- Uraeginthus angolensis (Linnaeus, 1758)

Synonyms
- Fringilla angolensis Linnaeus, 1758

= Blue waxbill =

Species of bird

The blue waxbill (Uraeginthus angolensis), also called southern blue waxbill, blue-breasted waxbill, southern cordon-bleu, blue-cheeked cordon-bleu, blue-breasted cordon-bleu and Angola cordon-bleu, is a common species of estrildid finch found in Southern Africa. It is also relatively commonly kept as an aviary bird.

== Taxonomy ==
The blue waxbill was formally described by the Swedish naturalist Carl Linnaeus in 1758 in the tenth edition of his Systema Naturae under the binomial name Fringilla angolensis. Linnaeus based his description on the "Blue-Belly'd Finch" that had been described and illustrated in 1750 by the English naturalist George Edwards in his A Natural History of Uncommon Birds. Edwards had viewed a caged bird in London that had come from Angola. This species is now placed in the genus Uraeginthus that was introduced by the German ornithologist Jean Cabanis in 1851.

Three subspecies are recognized:

Image	Subspecies	Distribution
	U. a. angolensis – (Linnaeus, 1758)	São Tomé, southwest DR Congo, north Angola and northwest Zambia
	U. a. cyanopleurus – Wolters, 1963	south Angola, southwest Zambia, northwest Zimbabwe and north Botswana
	U. a. niassensis – Reichenow, 1911	east Tanzania to central, east Zambia, Malawi, Mozambique, south Zimbabwe and east South Africa

== Description ==
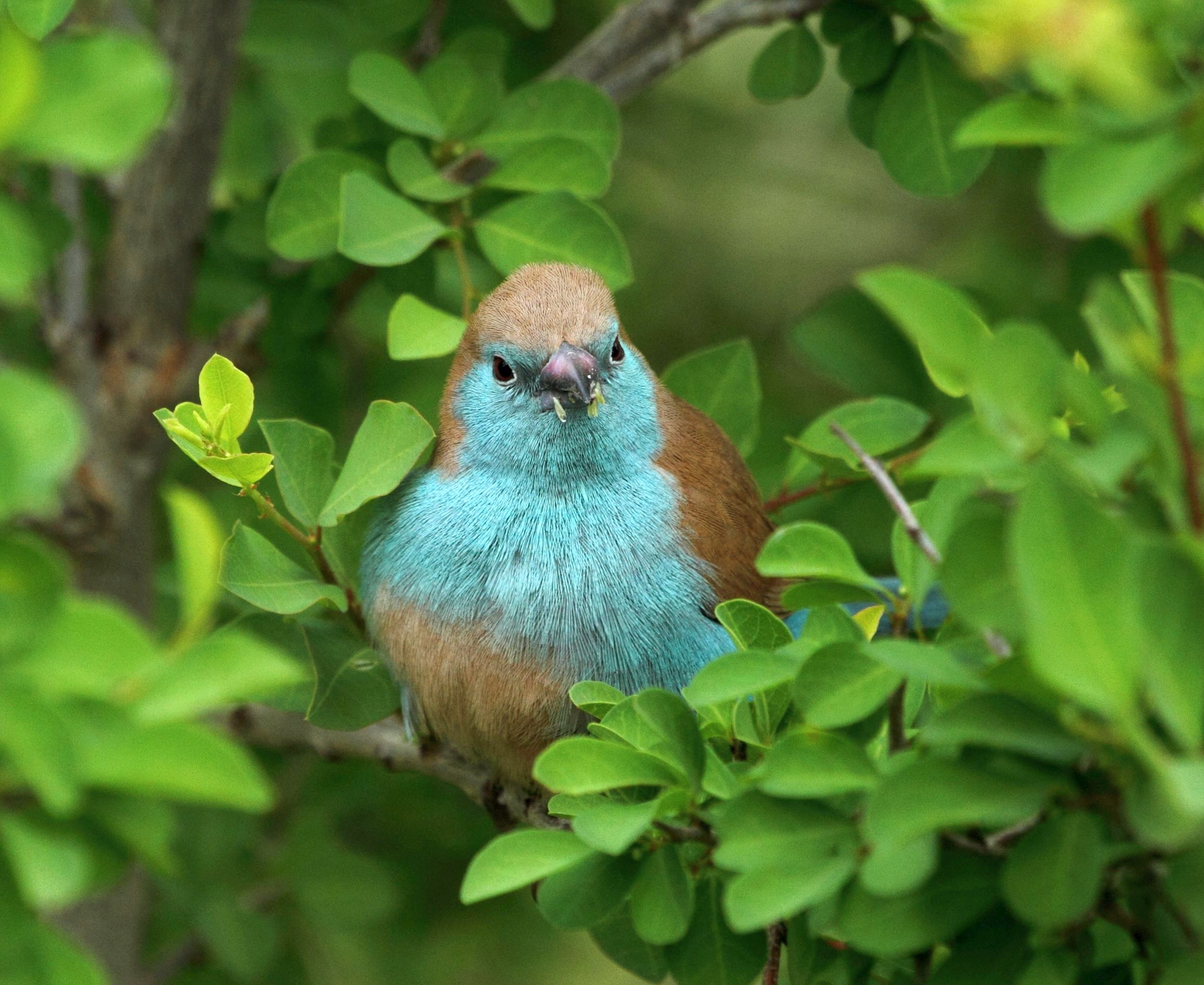
Male

The blue waxbill has powder-blue face, breast, rump, and flanks with pale brown upperparts. The female is paler than the male and the blue is confined to the rump, tail, head, and upper breast, with the rest of the underparts being buffy brown. They measure 12–13 cm in length.

The call is a soft 'seee-seee', often repeated as bird flits through the lower parts of bush and scrub.

== Distribution and habitat ==
The blue waxbill occurs in southern Africa from Cabinda and the Congo to Kenya and Tanzania in the east south to northern South Africa. It may have been introduced to the islands of São Tomé and to Zanzibar.

The blue waxbill occurs in a variety of habitats but generally prefers well-watered and semi-arid savanna, particularly where umbrella thorns Vachellia tortilis grow, also occupying natural growth in cultivated land, mopane Colosphermum mopane and forest edges.

== Behaviour and ecology ==
=== Breeding ===
Both sexes build the nest, an oval-shaped structure with a short entrance tunnel on the side, constructed of grass stems and inflorescences and lined with feathers. The nest is normally placed among the foliage of a bush or tree, especially umbrella thorn and sickle bush Dichrostachys cinerea. They often choose to build the nest near the nest of a wasp such as Belonogaster juncea; there is no evidence that wasps deter nest predators, but the birds may use the presence of wasp nests as a way of working out whether there are arboreal ants Pseudomyrmex spp in the tree, as if present they would deter nesting by any wasps or birds. Blue waxbills may also re-use the old nests of other birds, such as scarlet-chested sunbird, spectacled weaver or black-chested prinia, sometimes building a new structure on top of the original.

They breed all year round but egg laying usually peaks in January, two months on from the onset of the rains in southern Africa. The clutch size is between 2–7, incubation is carried out by both sexes and takes 11–12 days. Both parents feed the chicks on green grass seeds and termites, until they fledge after 17–21 days. They are capable of fending for themselves a week after fledging, becoming fully independent a week later.

=== Food and feeding ===
The blue waxbill mainly eats grass seeds, which are taken from the inflorescences. This is supplemented with termites and other insects. They have also been recorded eating the fallen fruits of Boscia albitrunca. They are normally seen in pairs or family parties, but do form larger flocks which often mix in with flocks of other estrildid finches.
