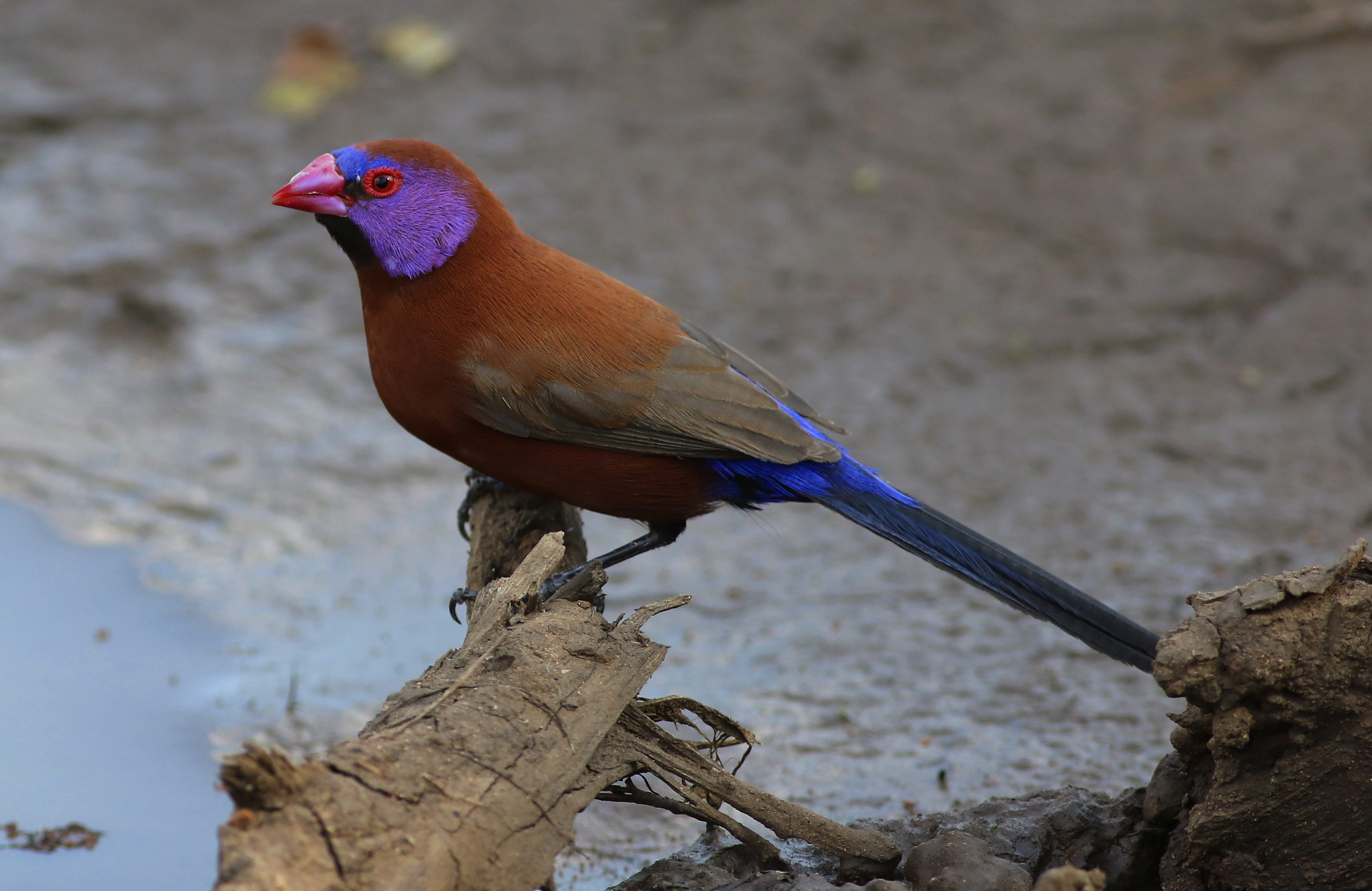
- Violet-eared waxbill (Granatina granatina)

Scientific classification
- Kingdom: Animalia
- Phylum: Chordata
- Class: Aves
- Order: Passeriformes
- Family: Estrildidae
- Genus: Granatina; Sharpe, 1890

Type species
- Fringilla granatina violet-eared waxbill Linnaeus, 1766

= Granatina =

Genus of birds

Granatina is a genus of small seed-eating birds in the family Estrildidae that are found in Africa.

== Taxonomy ==
The genus was introduced in 1890 by the English ornithologist Richard Bowdler Sharpe with the type species (by tautonomy) as the violet-eared waxbill (Fringilla granatina Linnaeus, 1766).

The two species now placed in this genus were formerly placed in Uraeginthus. The genus Granatina was resurrected based on a molecular phylogenetic study published in 2020 that found that these species were deeply divergent from the other species in Uraeginthus.

=== Species ===
The genus contains the following two species:

Image	Scientific name	Common name	Distribution
	Granatina granatina	Violet-eared waxbill	Southern Africa
	Granatina ianthinogaster	Purple grenadier	Ethiopia, Kenya, Somalia, South Sudan, Tanzania and Uganda
