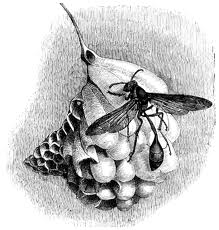

Scientific classification
- Kingdom: Animalia
- Phylum: Arthropoda
- Clade: Pancrustacea
- Class: Insecta
- Order: Hymenoptera
- Superfamily: Vespoidea
- Family: Vespidae
- Subfamily: Polistinae
- Tribe: Ropalidiini
- Genus: Belonogaster; Saussure, 1854

= Belonogaster =

Genus of wasps

Belonogaster (belone - "needle", gaster - "belly") is a large genus of mainly Afrotropical quasisocial wasps, although some species occur in Arabia and two extend as far as India. They have characteristics of both the eusocial and the solitary wasps. Belonogaster constructs communal paper nests where the larvae are fed on masticated, soft-bodied insects such as caterpillars. The type species is Belonogaster juncea, which consists of two subspecies: Belonogaster juncea colonialis and Belonogaster juncea juncea. Belanogaster wasps are an important food source for wintering European honey buzzards (Pernis apivorus) in sub-Saharan Africa. In African traditional medicine, wasps of the genus are cooked with plant roots and consumed to cure various childhood sicknesses, as well as having ceremonial use similar to that of honey bees (Apis mellifera). Some birds choose to build their nests near the nests of Belonogaster for protection, including mousebirds and weavers.

== Species ==
The following species are included:

- Belonogaster abyssinica Buysson, 1906
- Belonogaster acaulis Richards, 1982
- Belonogaster adenensis Giordani Soika, 1957
- Belonogaster apicalis Saussure, 1900
- Belonogaster arabica Giordani Soika, 1958
- Belonogaster atrata Schulthess, 1912
- Belonogaster aurata Richards, 1982
- Belonogaster barbata Richards, 1982
- Belonogaster bicolor Saussure, 1900
- Belonogaster bimaculata Richards, 1982
- Belonogaster brachystoma Kohl, 1894
- Belonogaster brevipetiolata Saussure, 1891
- Belonogaster brevitarsus Richards, 1982
- Belonogaster brunnea Ritsema, 1874
- Belonogaster brunnescens Richards, 1982
- Belonogaster clypeata Kohl, 1894
- Belonogaster dubia Kohl, 1894
- Belonogaster eumenoides Saussure, 1891
- Belonogaster facialis Buysson, 1908
- Belonogaster ferruginea Richards, 1982
- Belonogaster filiventris (Saussure, 1853)
- Belonogaster flava Richards, 1982
- Belonogaster freyi Buysson, 1909
- Belonogaster fuscipennis Buysson, 1909
- Belonogaster grisea (Fabricius, 1775)
- Belonogaster guerini (Saussure, 1853)
- Belonogaster hildebrandti Saussure, 1891
- Belonogaster hirsuta Richards, 1982
- Belonogaster jordani Richards, 1982
- Belonogaster juncea (Fabricius, 1781)
- Belonogaster keiseri Richards, 1982
- Belonogaster kelnerpillautae Richards, 1982
- Belonogaster kohli Schulz, 1906
- Belonogaster lateritia Gerstaecker, 1855
- Belonogaster leonhardii Buysson, 1909
- Belonogaster leonina Richards, 1982
- Belonogaster levior Richards, 1982
- Belonogaster libera Richards, 1982
- Belonogaster longitarsus Richards, 1982
- Belonogaster macilenta (Fabricius, 1781)
- Belonogaster maculata Richards, 1982
- Belonogaster madecassa (Saussure, 1853)
- Belonogaster maromandia Richards, 1982
- Belonogaster meneliki Gribodo, 1879
- Belonogaster multipunctata Richards, 1982
- Belonogaster neavei Richards, 1982
- Belonogaster nigricans Richards, 1982
- Belonogaster nitida Richards, 1982
- Belonogaster pennata Richards, 1982
- Belonogaster petiolata (Degeer, 1778)
- Belonogaster pileata Richards, 1982
- Belonogaster prasina Saussure, 1891
- Belonogaster principalis Richards, 1982
- Belonogaster punctata Richards, 1982
- Belonogaster punctilla Richards, 1982
- Belonogaster pusilloides Richards, 1982
- Belonogaster rothkirchi Schulthess, 1914
- Belonogaster saeva Saussure, 1891
- Belonogaster saussurei Kirby, 1881
- Belonogaster somereni Richards, 1982
- Belonogaster tarsata Kohl, 1893
- Belonogaster turbulenta Kohl, 1894
- Belonogaster turgida Kohl, 1894
- Belonogaster ugandae Richards, 1982
- Belonogaster vasseae Buysson, 1906
