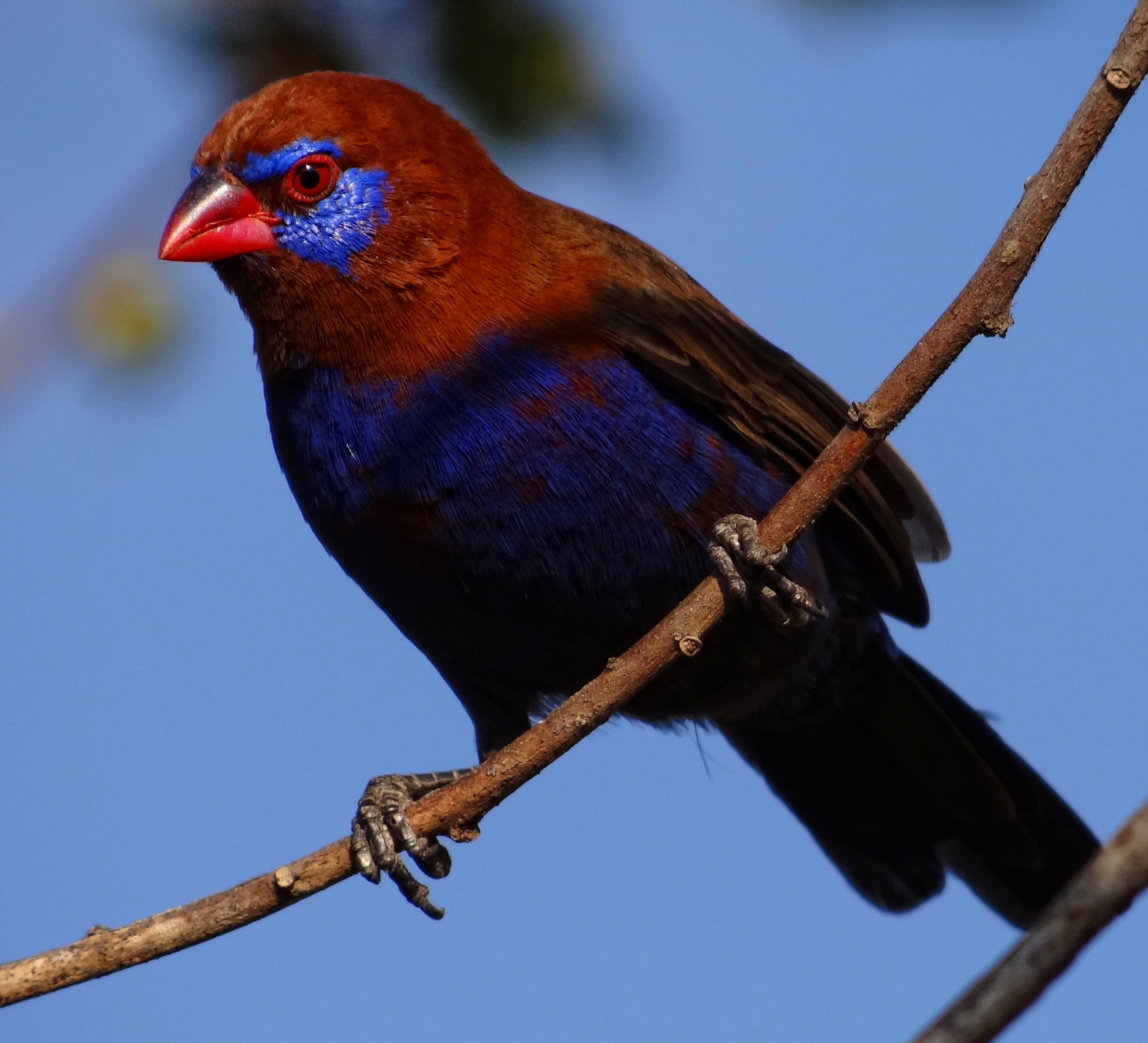
- Male in Serengeti National Park
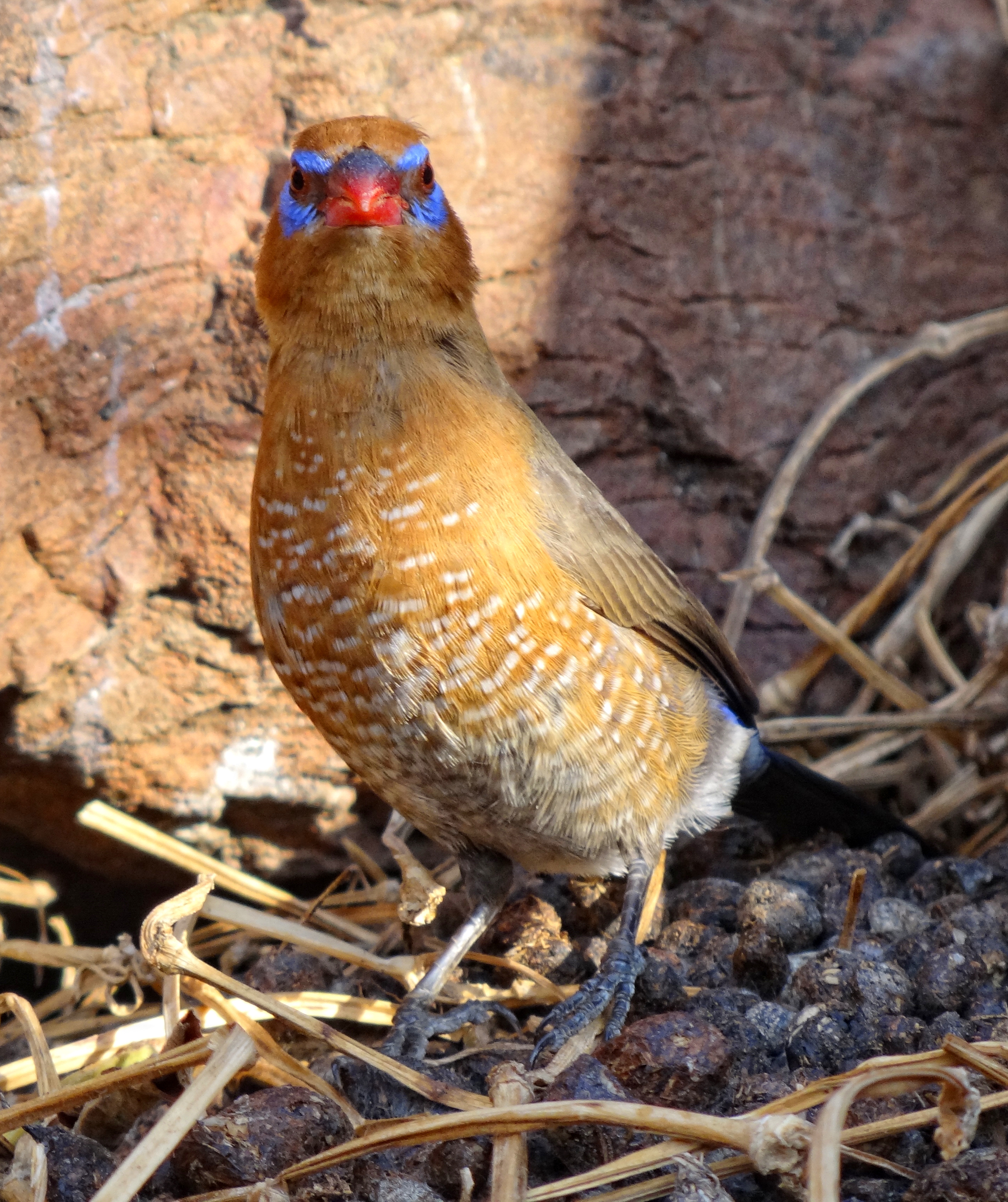
- Female, in Serengeti National Park

Conservation status
- Least Concern (IUCN 3.1)

Scientific classification
- Kingdom: Animalia
- Phylum: Chordata
- Class: Aves
- Order: Passeriformes
- Family: Estrildidae
- Genus: Granatina
- Species: G. ianthinogaster

Binomial name
- Granatina ianthinogaster (Reichenow, 1879)

= Purple grenadier =

Species of bird

The purple grenadier (Granatina ianthinogaster) is a common species of estrildid finch found in eastern Africa.

== Description ==
The length averages 13.3 cm (5.2 in). All ages and sexes have a black tail, and adults have a red bill. The male has a cinnamon-colored head and neck with a blue patch surrounding the eye. The rump is purplish blue and the underparts are violet-blue with variable rufous patches. The female is smaller and mostly cinnamon brown with white barring on the underparts and silver-blue eyepatches. Juveniles are like females, but mostly unbarred tawny-brown with a reddish-brown bill.

The song (in Kenya) is described as "a high, thin chit-cheet tsereea-ee-ee tsit-tsit, or cheerer cheet tsee-tsee sur-chit."

== Range and habitat ==
It is found in subtropical and tropical (lowland) dry shrubland in Ethiopia, Kenya, Somalia, South Sudan, Tanzania and Uganda, an estimated global extent of occurrence of 1,500,000 km^{2} (580,000 sq mi). The status of the species is evaluated as Least Concern.
