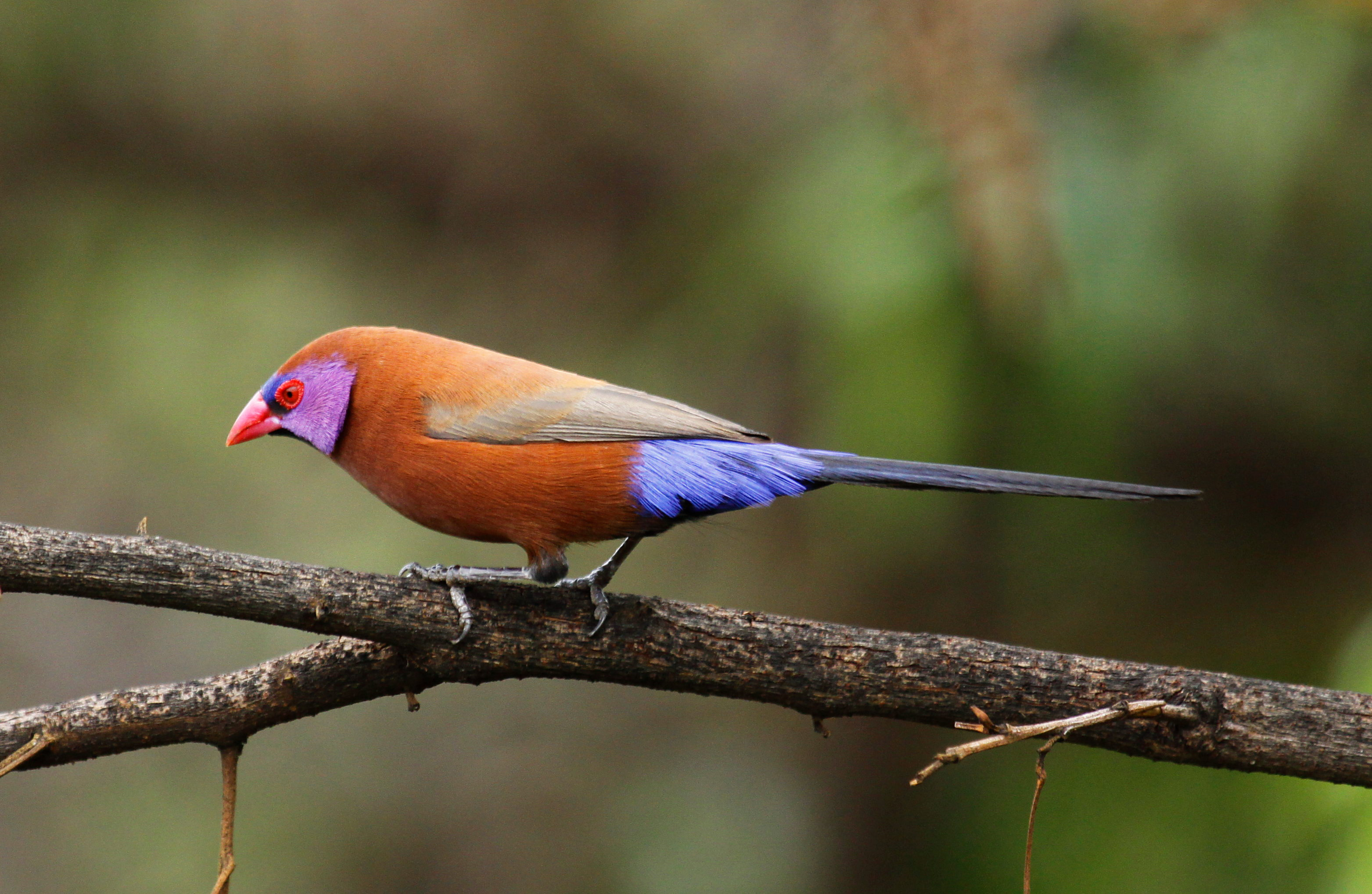

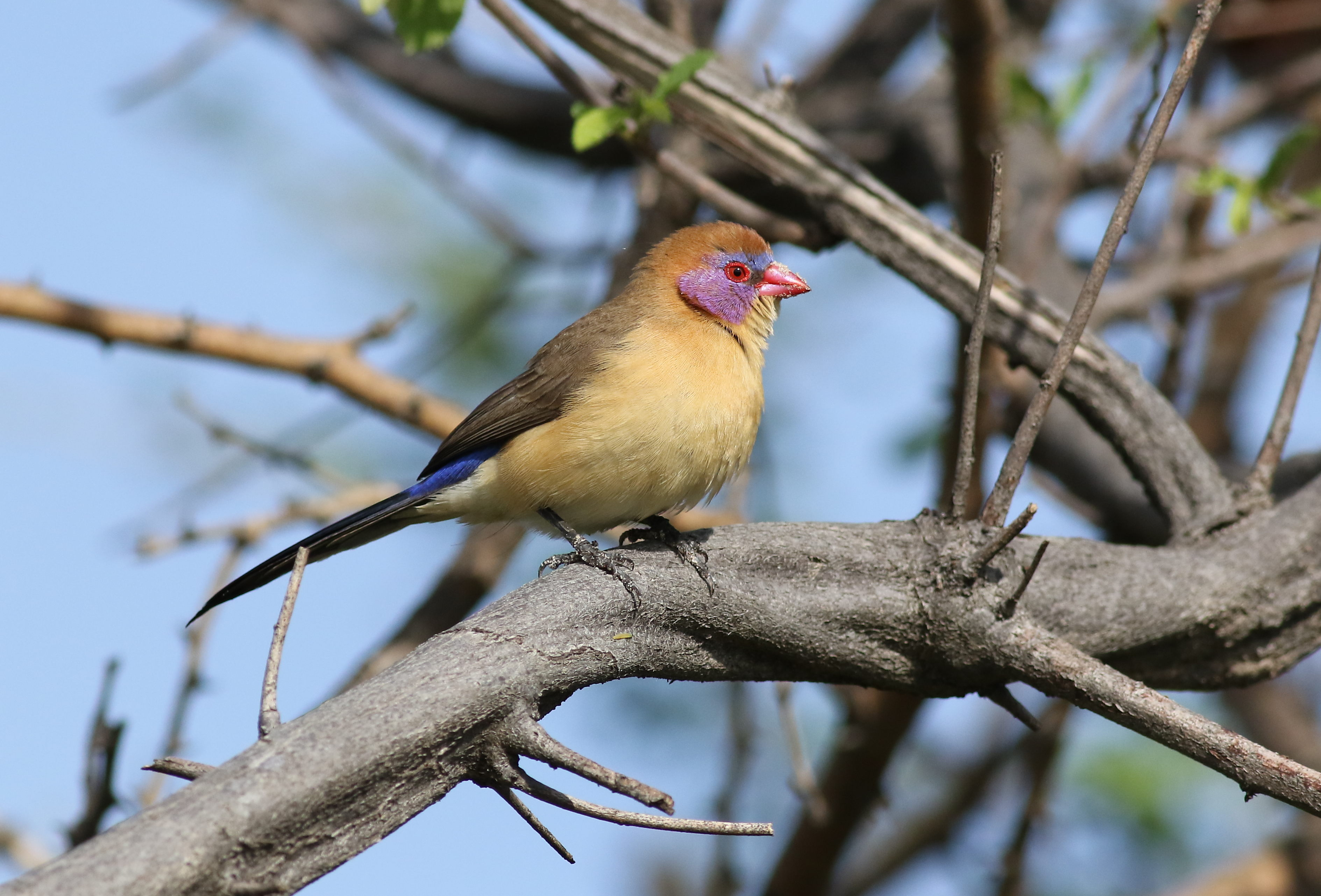
- Male above, female below

Conservation status
- Least Concern (IUCN 3.1)

Scientific classification
- Kingdom: Animalia
- Phylum: Chordata
- Class: Aves
- Order: Passeriformes
- Family: Estrildidae
- Genus: Granatina
- Species: G. granatina

Binomial name
- Granatina granatina (Linnaeus, 1766)

Synonyms
- Fringilla granatina Linnaeus, 1766

= Violet-eared waxbill =

Species of bird

The violet-eared waxbill or common grenadier (Granatina granatina) is a common species of estrildid finch found in drier land of Southern Africa.

== Taxonomy ==
The violet-eared waxbill was formally described in 1766 by the Swedish naturalist Carl Linnaeus in the twelfth edition of his Systema Naturae under the binomial name Fringilla granatina. Linnaeus took the specific epithet from the earlier description by the French zoologist Mathurin Jacques Brisson who in 1760 had used the French name Le Grenadin and the Latin Granatinus, meaning "grenadier" in English. Linnaeus mistakenly specified the locality as Brazil. This was an error originally introduced by the English naturalist George Edwards in 1743 who had believed that his specimen had come from Brazil. The locality was amended to Angola by William Lutley Sclater in 1930 and restricted to Huíla Province in Angola by Phillip Clancey in 1959. The violet-eared waxbill is now placed in the genus Granatina that was introduced in 1890 by the English ornithologist Richard Bowdler Sharpe. The species is treated as monotypic: no subspecies are recognised.

== Habitat ==
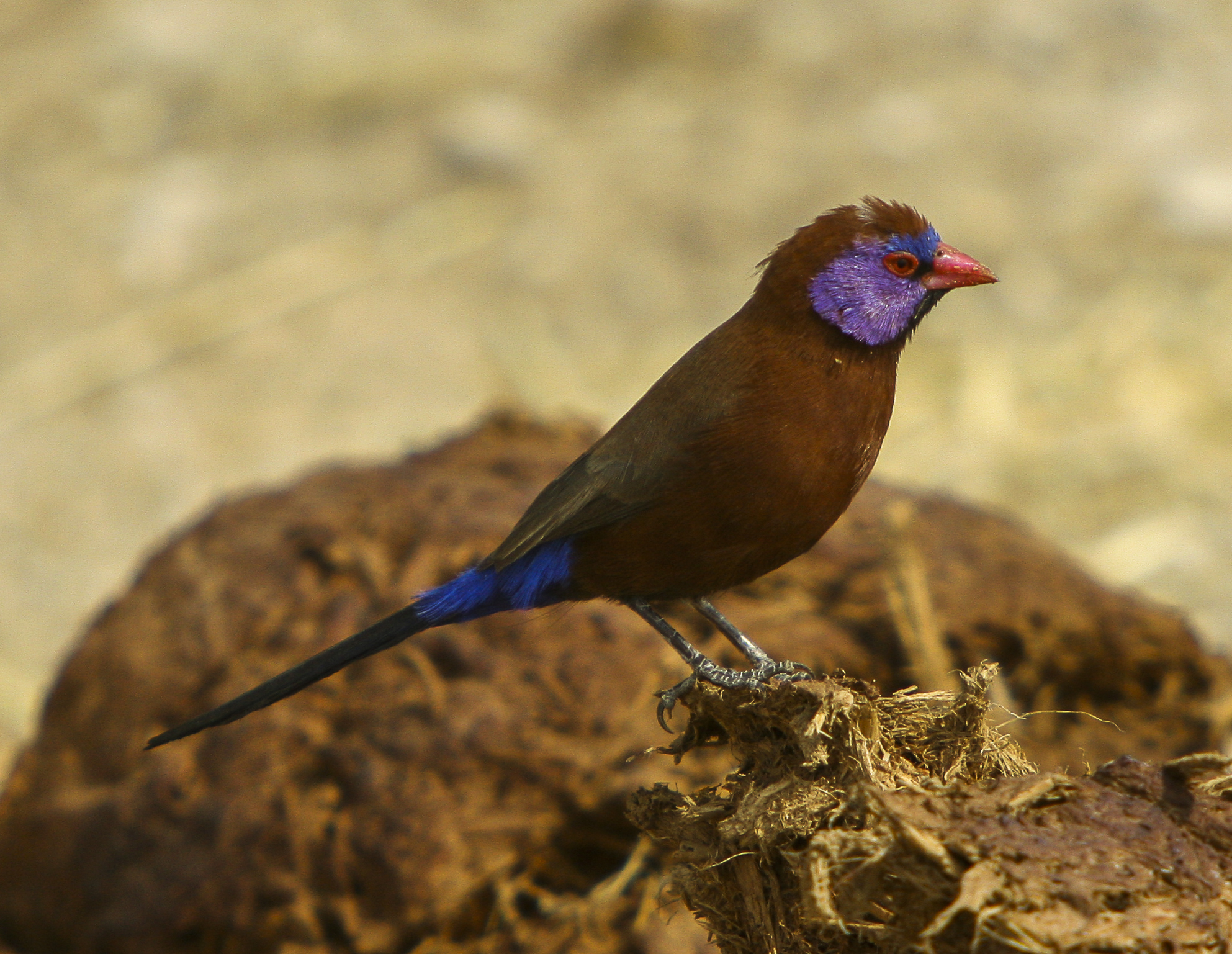
Violet-eared waxbill at Etosha National Park, Namibia

It is found in subtropical/ tropical (lowland) dry shrubland and savanna habitats in Angola, Botswana, Mozambique, Namibia, South Africa, Zambia and Zimbabwe. The status of the species is evaluated as Least Concern.
