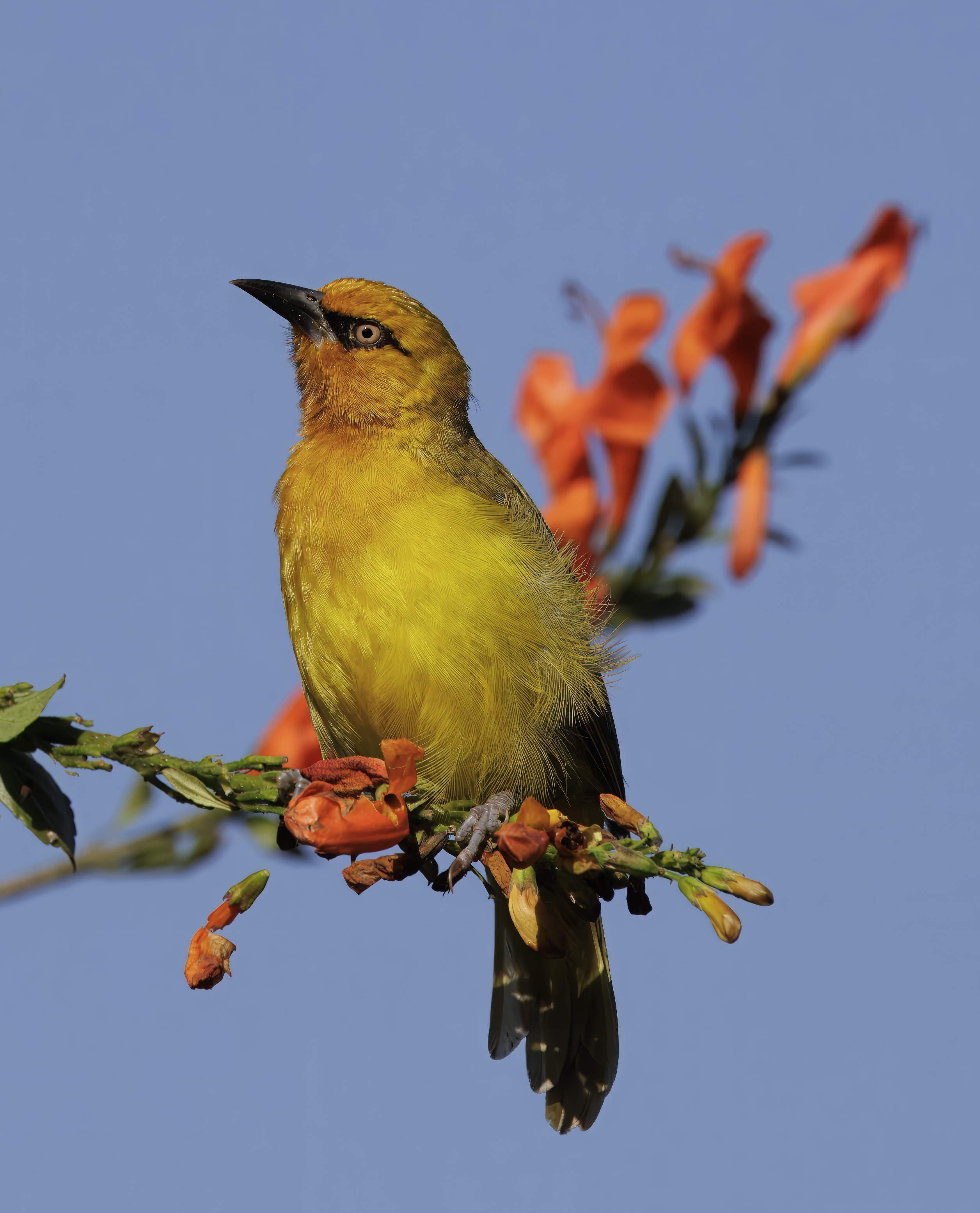
- Male P. o. ocularis Mpumalanga, South Africa
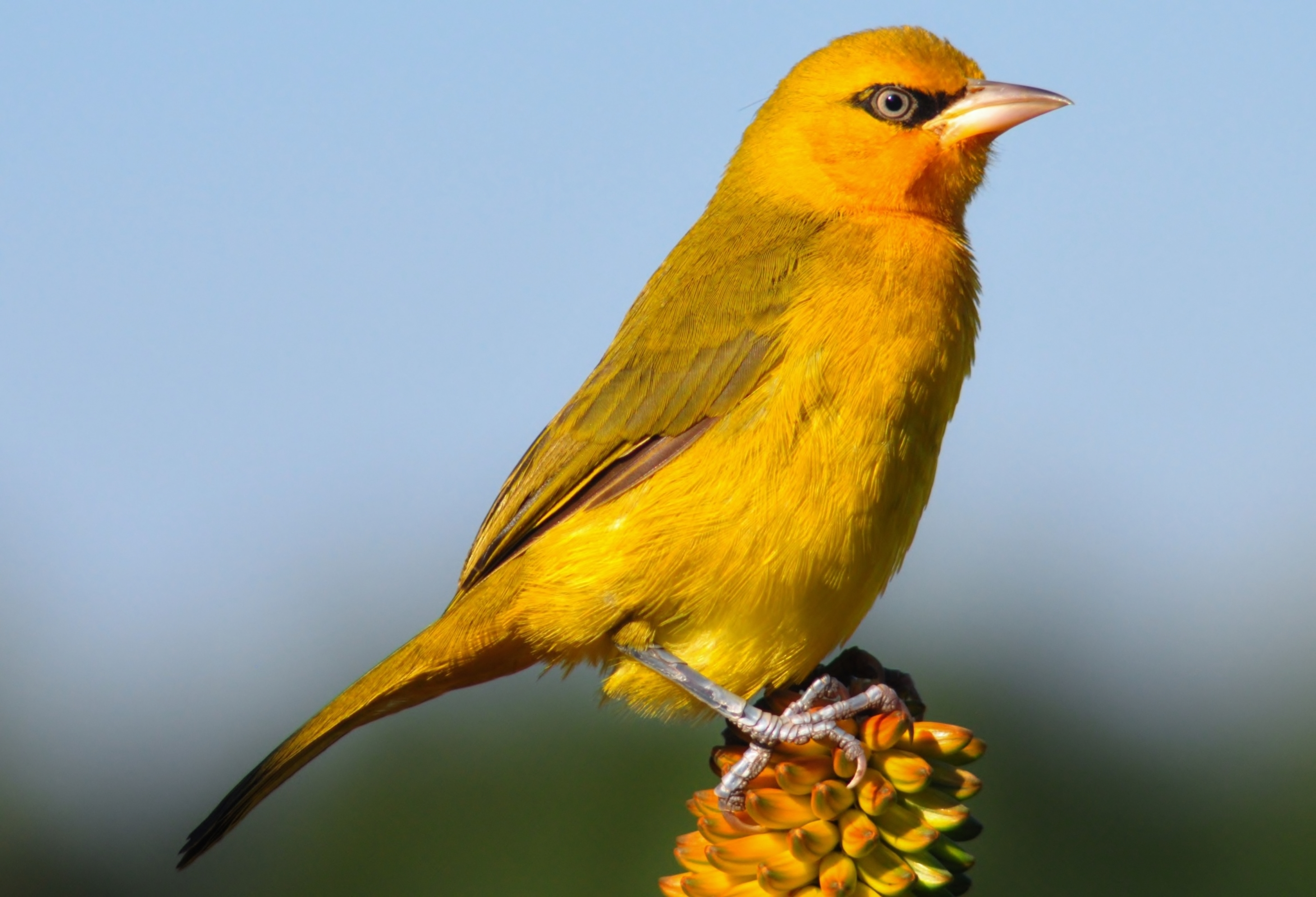
- Female in Durban, South Africa

Conservation status
- Least Concern (IUCN 3.1)

Scientific classification
- Kingdom: Animalia
- Phylum: Chordata
- Class: Aves
- Order: Passeriformes
- Family: Ploceidae
- Genus: Ploceus
- Species: P. ocularis

Binomial name
- Ploceus ocularis Smith, 1828

= Spectacled weaver =

Species of bird

The spectacled weaver (Ploceus ocularis) is a species of bird in the family Ploceidae. It is found widely in woodland, forest edge and gardens of central, eastern and south-eastern Africa, but is absent from the most arid regions (such as the Karoo) and dense, primary rainforest. This common species breeds in solitary pairs, and both sexes are bright yellow, have an olive-yellow back, black "spectacles" and pale eyes. The male has a black throat.

== Gallery ==
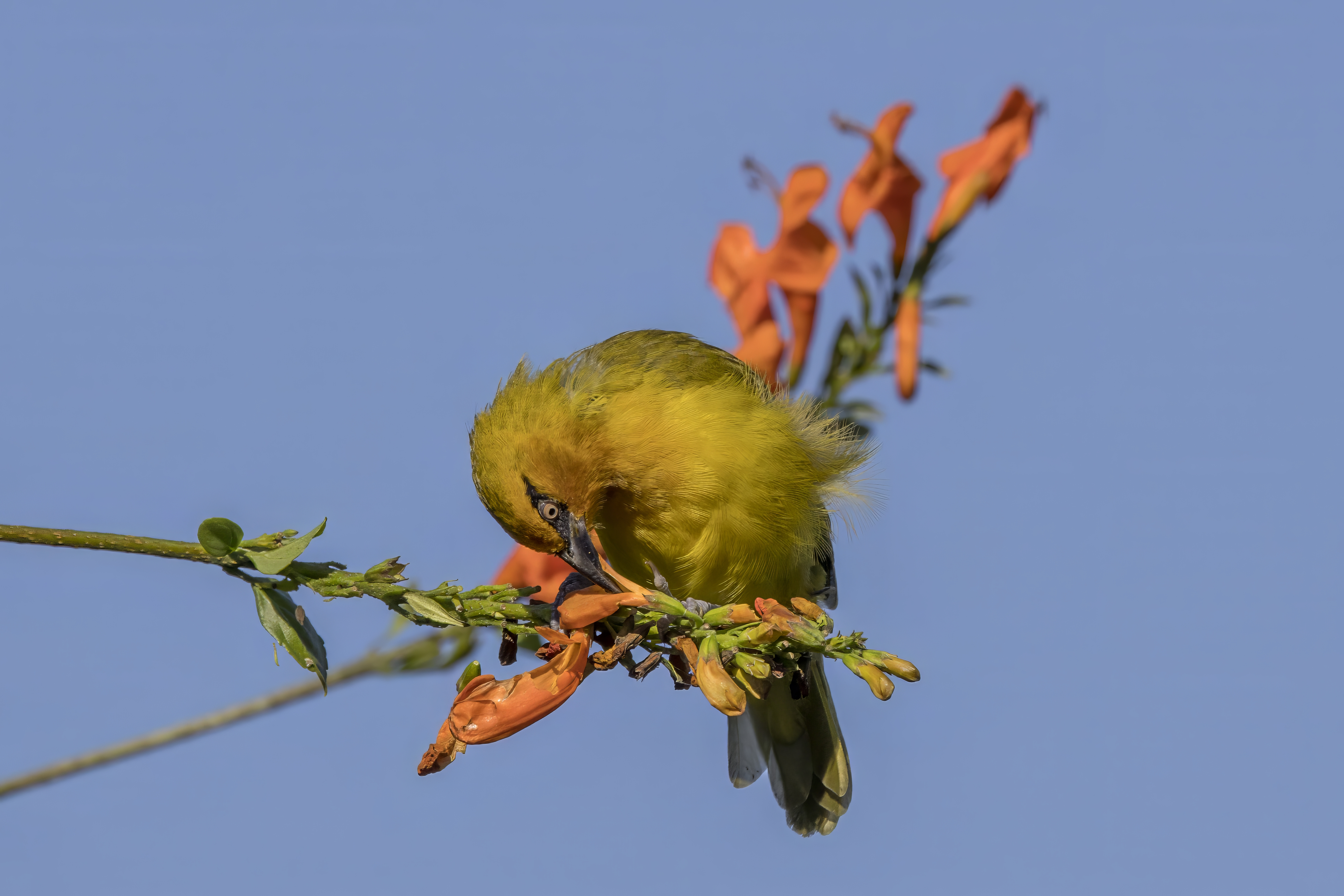
male feeding

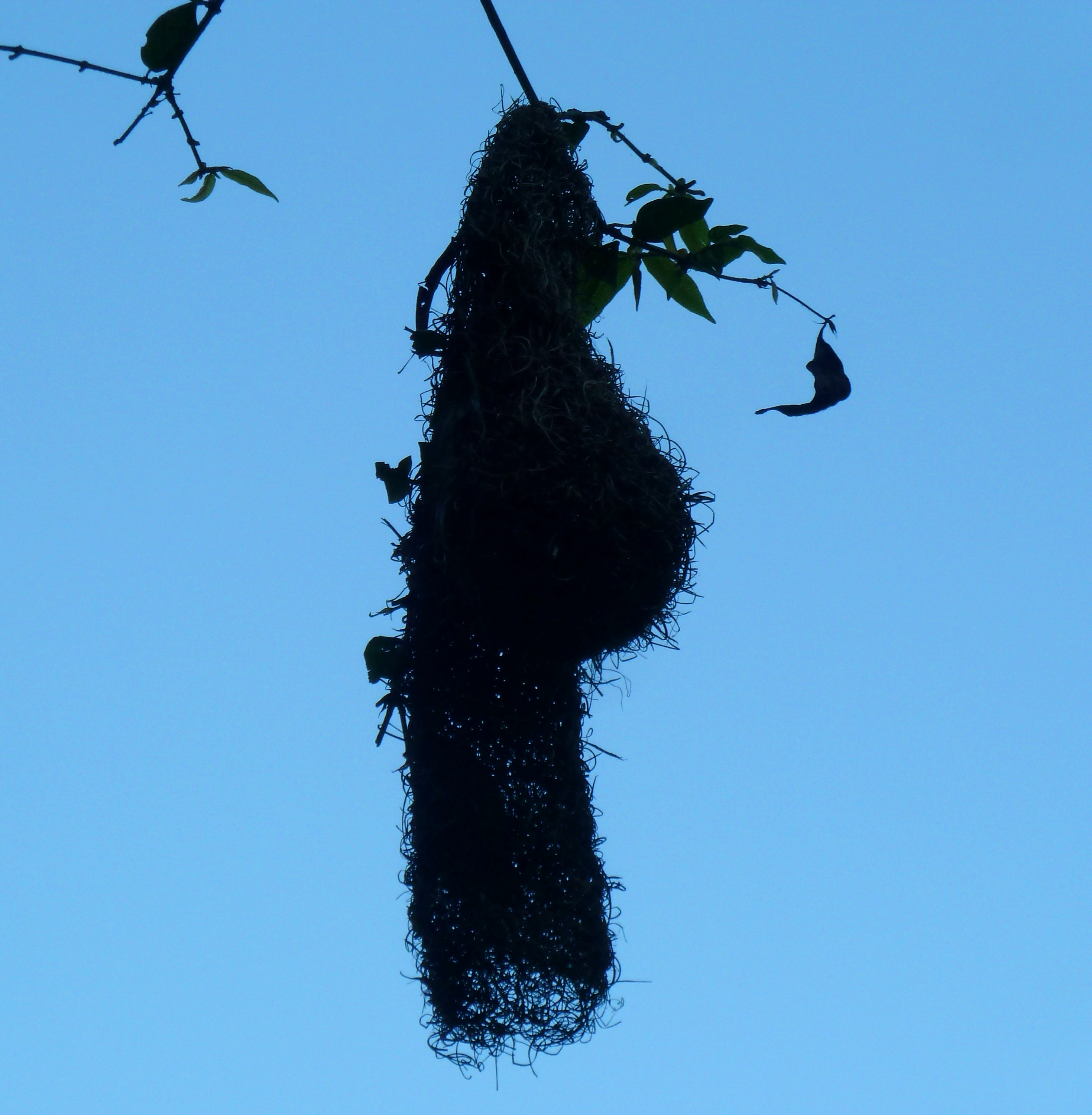
Suspended nest with long entrance spout

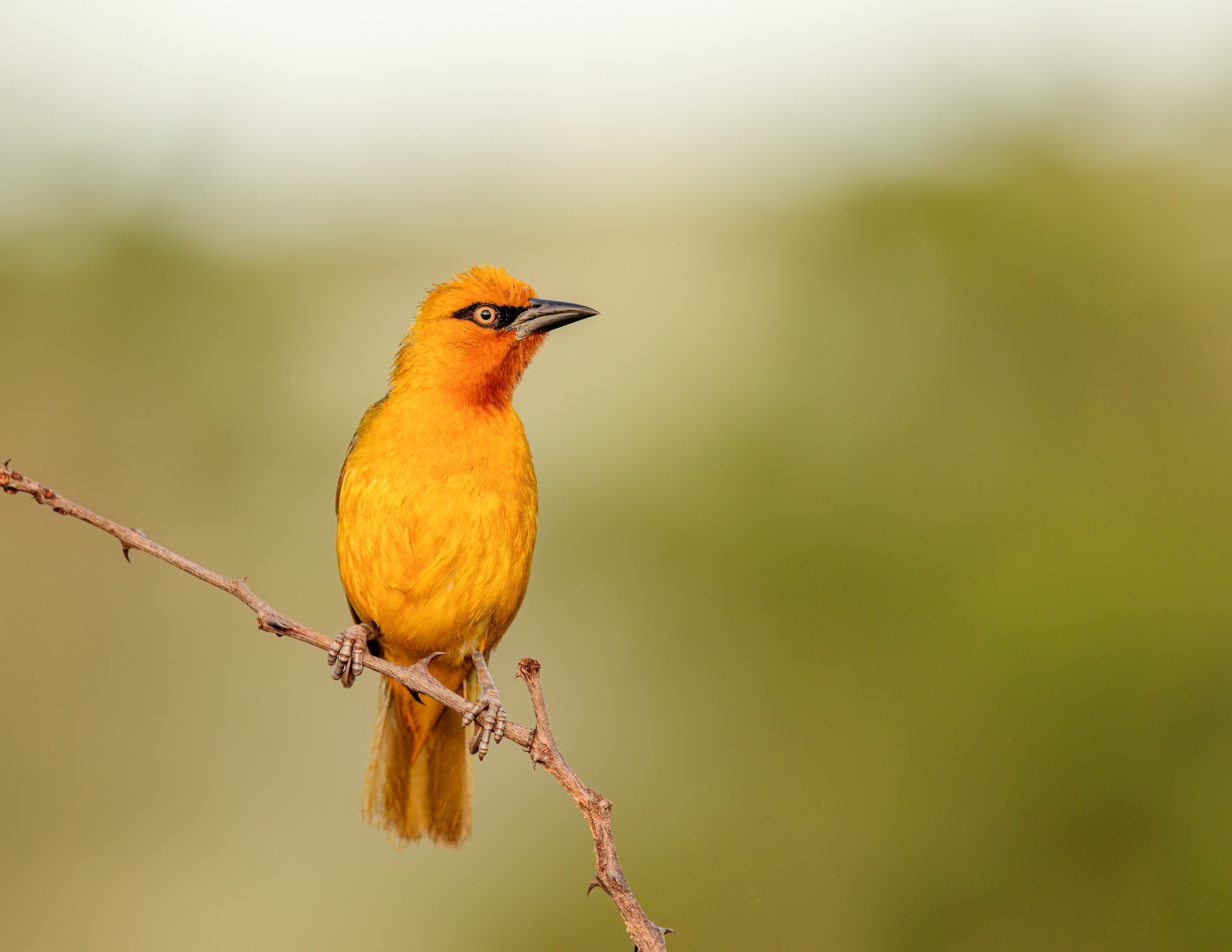
male
