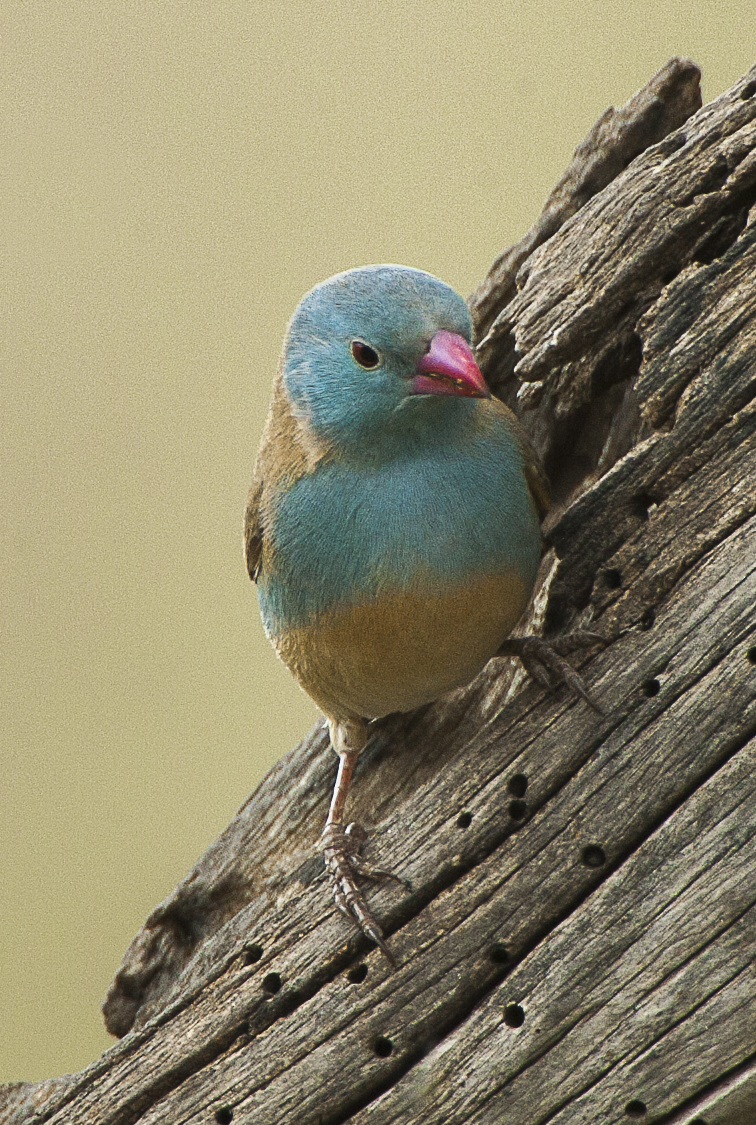
- Male, Lake Ndutu, Tanzania

Conservation status
- Least Concern (IUCN 3.1)

Scientific classification
- Kingdom: Animalia
- Phylum: Chordata
- Class: Aves
- Order: Passeriformes
- Family: Estrildidae
- Genus: Uraeginthus
- Species: U. cyanocephalus

Binomial name
- Uraeginthus cyanocephalus (Richmond, 1897)

= Blue-capped cordon-bleu =

Species of bird

The blue-capped cordon-bleu or blue-capped cordonbleu (Uraeginthus cyanocephalus) is native to Ethiopia, Kenya, Somalia, South Sudan, and Tanzania in East Africa. This small finch does fairly well in captivity given adequate conditions; however, breeding this finch is said to be quite difficult.

== Habitat ==
The blue-capped cordon-bleu inhabits the subtropical or tropical (lowland) dry grasslands, shrublands, and deserts of subsaharan Africa. It has an estimated global extent of occurrence of 390,000 km^{2}.

== Feature ==
The finch is an omnivorous passerine eating seeds and small insects. Most of this species do not exceed 7.5 cm (3.0 in) in length and are quiet relative to other finches.

Males have blue on the tops of their heads and tend to be more vivid in colour. On female blue-caps the light brown coloration on the wings extends to the nape of the neck and over the top the head. Pairs dance holding twigs in their beaks, and film using a high-speed camera shows partners tapping their feet between twenty-five and fifty times a second, making a buzzing sound.
