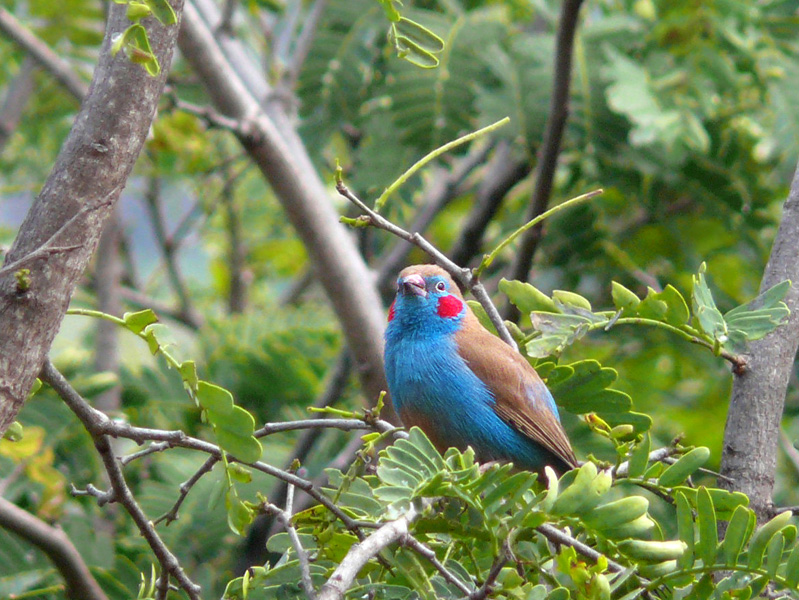
- Red-cheeked cordon-bleu (Uraeginthus bengalus)

Scientific classification
- Kingdom: Animalia
- Phylum: Chordata
- Class: Aves
- Order: Passeriformes
- Family: Estrildidae
- Genus: Uraeginthus; Cabanis, 1851

Type species
- Fringilla bengalus Linnaeus, 1766

= Uraeginthus =

Genus of birds

Uraeginthus is a genus of small seed-eating birds in the family Estrildidae that are found in Sub-Saharan Africa.

== Taxonomy ==
The genus was introduced by the German ornithologist Jean Cabanis in 1851. The type species was subsequently designated as the red-cheeked cordon-bleu. The name Uraeginthus combines the Ancient Greek words oura "tail" and aiginthos for an unknown bird, perhaps a finch.

== Species ==
It contains the following three species:

Genus Uraeginthus – Cabanis, 1851 – three species
Common name	Scientific name and subspecies	Range	Size and ecology	IUCN status and estimated population
Blue waxbill Male Female	Uraeginthus angolensis (Linnaeus, 1758) Three subspecies: U. a. angolensis (Linnaeus, 1758); U. a. cyanopleurus Wolters, 1963; U. a. niassensis Reichenow, 1911	Cabinda and the Congo to Kenya and Tanzania in the east south to northern South Africa	Size: Habitat: Diet:	LC
Red-cheeked cordon-bleu Male Female	Uraeginthus bengalus (Linnaeus, 1766) Four subspecies: U. b. bengalus (Linnaeus, 1766); U. b. brunneigularis Mearns, 1911; U. b. ugogensis Reichenow, 1911; U. b. katangae Vincent, 1934	Ethiopia, Uganda, Kenya, Tanzania, Angola, south Democratic Republic of the Congo and north Zambia	Size: Habitat: Diet:	LC
Blue-capped cordon-bleu	Uraeginthus cyanocephalus (Richmond, 1897)	Ethiopia, Kenya, Somalia, South Sudan, and Tanzania in East Africa	Size: Habitat: Diet:	LC
