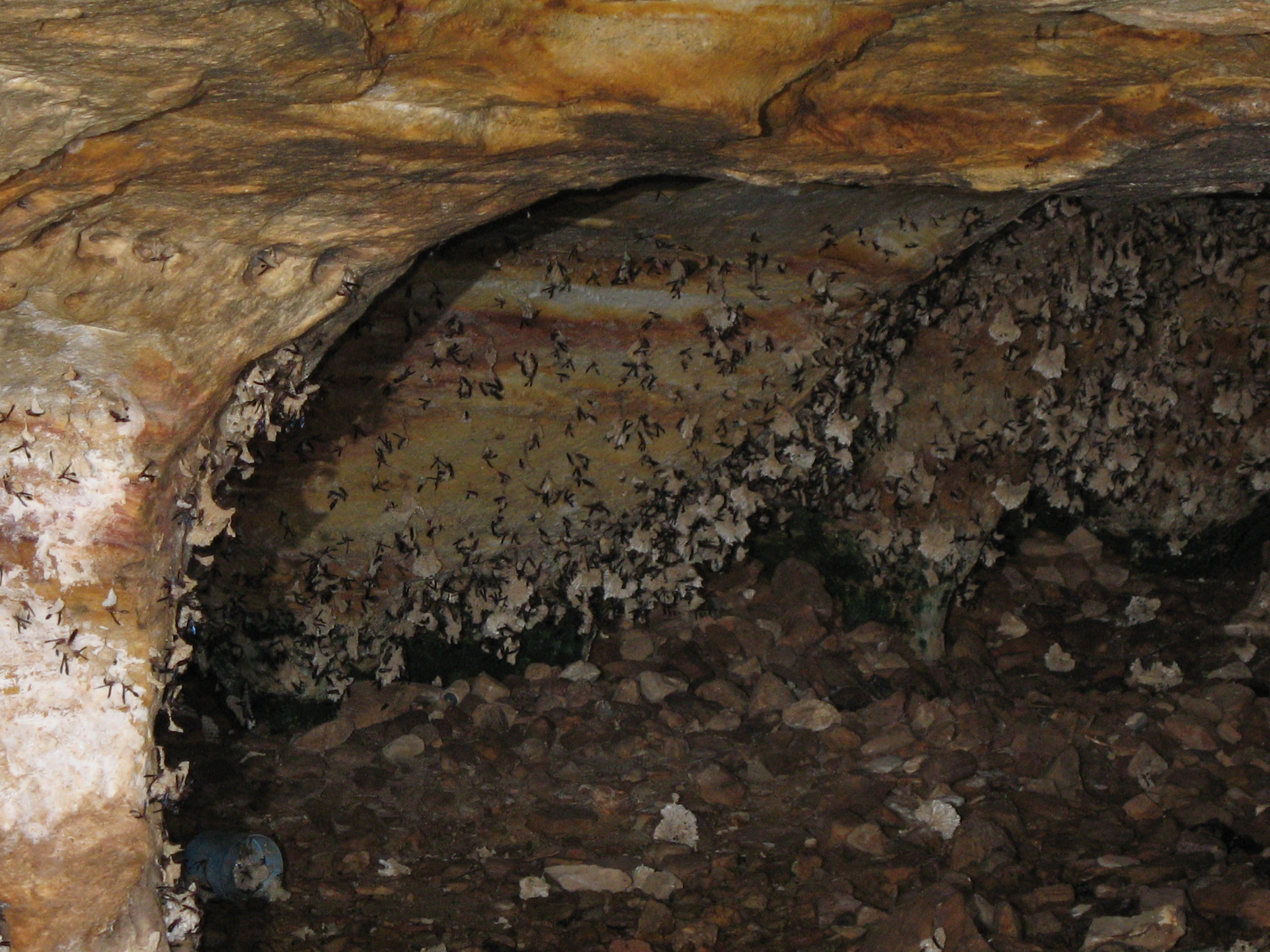
- Belonogaster petiolata nests

Scientific classification
- Kingdom: Animalia
- Phylum: Arthropoda
- Clade: Pancrustacea
- Class: Insecta
- Order: Hymenoptera
- Family: Vespidae
- Subfamily: Polistinae
- Tribe: Ropalidiini
- Genus: Belonogaster
- Species: B. petiolata

Binomial name
- Belonogaster petiolata (De Geer, 1778)

Synonyms
- Belonogaster brachycerus Kohl, 1894; Belonogaster linearis (Olivier, 1792); Belonogaster petiolatus (De Geer, 1778); Polistes linearis (Olivier, 1792); Vespa linearis Olivier, 1792; Vespa petiolata De Geer, 1778

= Belonogaster petiolata =

Species of wasp

Belonogaster petiolata is a species of primitively eusocial wasp that dwells in southern Africa, in temperate or subhumid climate zones. This wasp species has a strong presence in South Africa and has also been seen in northern Johannesburg. Many colonies can be found in caves. The Sterkfontein Caves in South Africa, for example, contain large populations of B. petiolata.

This species primarily eats small insects, especially caterpillars, which are considered its "solid food", while nectar is its liquid food. It also requires water for survival.

== Taxonomy and phylogeny ==
Belonogaster petiolata belongs to the genus Belonogaster, of the subfamily Polistinae, and is closely related to B. juncea and B. grisea. Belonogaster wasps are part of the family Vespidae and the order Hymenoptera. Species in this family display a full range of social organization, from completely solitary to highly eusocial life cycles. Many of B. petiolata's characteristics are very similar to those of B. grisea. In both species, the production of smaller, unmated worker offspring reaches a maximum before the production of larger queens who leave the nest and mate.

== Description and identification ==
These wasps have a thorax (upper midsection area) and a longer striped gaster with a sting on the end. The peduncle is the first gastral segment. The legs are attached to the thorax. The queen B. petiolata has a large gaster and a smaller head, while the worker wasps have relatively large heads and smaller gasters. Also, queens, males and other members of the reproductive caste have larger fat reserves than the workers, allowing them to survive the winters.

B. petiolata construct paper nests out of pulp that often hang in caves or under shelter. The wasps often get pulp from old cells or from larvae just before maturation. Before the larvae mature, the wasps chew the cells at the base to help the offspring emerge. This cell debris is used to build nests. The nest has combs in which the queen often dwells. Later on, however, the queen may move to the top of the nest to rest.

== Distribution and habitat ==
B. petiolata can be found in southern Africa and they have a large presence in the country of South Africa. They prefer warm temperate or moist subhumid climates, with mean daily temperatures varying between a maximum of 25 °C (77 °F) and minimum of 14.9 °C (58.8 °F) in January and a maximum of 15.7 °C (60.3 °F) and minimum of 5.3 °C (41.5 °F) in June. This species primarily resides in sheltered caves. They build nests hanging from cave walls. This species is abundant in southern Africa, and it is not a threatened species.

== Colony cycle ==
The annual nesting cycle of B. petiolata is similar to other Polistines that dwell in similar temperate climates. Colonies which are started by a single queen are usually only primitively eusocial and smaller in size, while colonies started by groups of queens are more eusocial and house more individuals. The annual nesting cycle in B. petiolata typically begins in August, where nests are created by overwintered foundress females. In a colony, there is a pre-emergence period. This occurs before the emergence of the first offspring, which are the worker wasps. Next, there is a post-emergence period, which is the whole duration of the colony cycle following the appearance of offspring wasps. There is also a pre-matrifilial phase, which is the first part of the post-emergence period when subordinate foundresses are still present in nests and interact with workers. Following this period is the matrifilial phase which follows the disappearance of all subordinates. Now, colonies consist only of the queen and her workers. Lastly, there is a reproductive phase where reproductive offspring (gynes and males) are born. Typically, gynes begin emerging from nests in early February, so any female collected in colonies up to the end of January of each season will most likely be workers. Nesting is annual with single, overwintered foundresses initiating new nests in spring. The overwintering period is about 4.5 months. Later, in roughly half of the cases, one or more additional females come to form multiple foundress colonies and join these initial foundresses. Foundress associations of up to 16 foundresses can be formed. A dominance hierarchy then forms with the dominant female becoming the queen and the others becoming subordinates. The queen helps build and initiate the nest at first, during the pre and post emergence periods, but then becomes lethargic. She stops foraging for pulp and ceases her aid in the nest construction. At the end of the season, the female queen leaves the nest for the winter and returns the following year to create a new colony.

=== Mortality and decline of a colony ===
Several factors appear to contribute to brood decline and the end of the colony cycle in B. petiolata. These include: cessation of the supply of solid food to colonies and larvae during the reproductive phase, a decrease in the worker/larva ratio during the latter phase due to the slow loss of workers, increasing the number of gynes and males, and an adult priority over food reception from foragers. The brood gets aborted to feed hungry adults. Eventually, the brood declines and the adults leave the nest. Usually, some cell demolition is done by the queen in post emergence colonies.

== Behavior ==
=== Dominance hierarchy ===
The workers carry out nearly all the basic work, like creating and fixing damage to the nest, getting food, and feeding the larvae. The queen's primary job is to lay eggs. When there is an active queen, workers often have undeveloped ovaries. However, when the queen is removed, 11% of workers develop mature ovaries. This is reproductive suppression under the power of the queen. If there are any eggs found that are not laid by the queen, she eats them (oophagy). Most of these eggs were likely laid by subordinates. Queens often get to rest in the central areas of the nest close to the growing larvae while subordinates and workers often position themselves in the outer areas of the nest.

=== Dominant interactions and communication ===
The queen creates a dominance hierarchy by initiating dominant interactions. These include biting, hooking, and soliciting. In hooking, females grasp subordinates and hang from them in a hook like formation while receiving regurgitate. The queen often displays these behaviors to assert her dominant status to the other wasps. In soliciting, the dominant female approaches the other female with her antennae outstretched and antennates her head, especially her mouthparts. The other females respond by ignoring the soliciting, remaining immobile in a submissive way until the other wasp leaves, or by soliciting back. Sometimes the queens initially exhibit dominance behaviors, but then move to the top of the nest and become more inactive towards the end of the colony cycle. Other times, the queens are always dominant throughout the whole cycle. Females usually direct their dominance behaviors at the females directly below them in the dominance hierarchy. The queens are the most aggressive females in the nest, so receive fewer threats.

=== Oophagy and oviposition behaviors ===
Sometimes, a queen or another female will eat eggs laid in her own colony. The majority of the time she eats the eggs of her subordinates, however, a female may occasionally eat her own eggs. Queens also undertake egg inspections to see if the eggs in the nest are their own or if they were laid by a subordinate. The majority of oophagies are committed by the queen (87.5%). Oviposition is the laying of eggs. Queens lay 83.3% of the eggs in pre-emergence colonies, which is a significantly higher rate of oviposition than that of subordinates. Workers were never observed eating or laying eggs.

=== Trophallaxis ===
The larval saliva of B. petiolata contains many amino acids and nutrients that are useful for adult wasps. Females who are looking to lay eggs solicit larvae in order to receive some salivary fluid so they can gain some nutrients before laying the eggs. To do this, females undergo trophallaxis with the larvae. The larvae are first fed masticated food by the females wasps and then in return, the larvae produce salivary fluid. Usually, the wasps prompt the larvae to produce this salivary secretion by antennating a larva's head and vibrating its body. The larva then extends its head and produces a drop of clear saliva. Adults wasps prefer to solicit older larvae for trophallaxis, likely because they expect to receive more saliva from older larvae than from younger larvae. Sometimes, body vibrations of soliciting adults become synchronized and this seems to excite the larva in a positive way.

== Kin selection ==
=== Caste system ===
There is a caste system within the B. petiolata colonies. There are physiological and morphological differences between worker castes and reproductive castes. Foundresses and gynes (reproductive caste) are generally larger than workers. When workers are first born their body size is much smaller than gynes and foundresses, but later in the colony cycle, their size grows more similar to gynes. Foundresses and gynes have larger ovaries and more fat content than workers do. Workers have broad heads, while the reproductive caste wasps have broader thoraces and gasters. Typically, foundresses are larger than their subordinates. Also, about 98% of queens (foundresses) and 95% of gynes are found to be inseminated, while workers are not. They have immature ovaries that do not function in the presence of an active queen. When there is no active queen, about 11% of workers develop mature ovaries. Active queens are the primary egg layers in colonies and possess well-developed ovaries. Differentiation of castes sometimes occurs early during larval development, or it can happen during the later adult stage due to differing social communications and adult nutrition. A wasp's ability to survive winter, and its number of fat reserves, has been used to distinguish gynes from workers. Fat content is an indicator of caste.

=== The removal of the queen ===
The dominance of the queen over the colony keeps the subordinant nature of worker wasps intact. When a queen dies, however, an older alpha worker, that was likely present when the colony was younger, often takes up the dominant position. The loss of a queen is also associated with the development of ovaries in 11% of worker wasps and in many alpha workers. During the pre-matrifilial stage, in colonies of B. petiolata, removal of the queen led to her replacement by the second most dominant foundress, who is known as a beta-foundress, instead of a worker.

== Reproduction ==
=== Copulation ===
Mating occurs when a male wasp approaches a female, and the two undergo mutual or unilateral antennation, where the pair touches each other's antennae or the male probes the female's thorax and abdomen with his antennae. Then, the male mounts the female and begins to establish genital contact by touching the female's abdomen with his own. Copulation only lasts about five seconds.

=== Ovary size ===
The ovarian width of gynes increased from April to July which is within the overwintering period. From July through August, mean ovarian width of overwintering females increased sharply, and then fell between late August and September. The percent of gynes with mature oocytes in their ovaries increased from 2.9% in April to 15.6% at the end of July, and then lastly to 45.7% in August. Female wasps with larger ovaries are more likely to lay eggs. Workers have thin, inactive ovaries that prevent them from ovipositing.

=== Insemination ===
Workers are rarely, if ever, inseminated. None of the workers from pre-matrifilial and matrifilial colonies were observed by Keeping, M.G. (2002) to be inseminated. Overwintering gynes from Sterkfontein cave had the highest percent insemination. Lack of insemination has frequently been used as a criterion for distinguishing queens from workers in social wasps. All queens and nearly 98% of subordinate foundresses were inseminated. Workers may not be inseminated because they emerge over the period of the colony cycle when males are absent. Inseminated daughters were only recorded from late February onwards, coinciding with the period of male production. Of course, inseminated individuals are more likely to lay eggs and are seen as part of the reproductive caste.

=== Mate recognition cues ===
Gynes and other female wasps have mate recognition signals, or pheromones, within their venom, thorax and heads. This causes males to be attracted to them. The pheromones within the venom seem to be very strong compared to pheromones from the thorax and head. These pheromones are often spread all over the body during grooming, further increasing the females' attractiveness to males.

== Diet ==
B. petiolata eat solid food as well as drink nectar as a food source. They prey on grubs and other small insects. Often they chew the food and regurgitate it back up to feed others and the young brood. They also need water to survive. Queens always receive more food. They get 43.7% of liquid loads and 47.8% of solid food loads. They only fed 63.3% of this solid food to larvae and kept the rest for themselves. A lapse in solid food can cause a colony to decline. In late summer, there is often a reduction in the amount of available prey, so many wasps switch to just foraging for nectar, using this as its primary food source. Poor rainfall is often the cause for a decrease in prey abundance. Wasps are fed and enjoy mealworms when they are in captivity.

== Growth and development ==
Recently emerged individual young wasps have black or brown eyes, while older individuals have pink eyes and grow wings to fly. When workers are first born, they often huddle together in a corner to avoid aggressive acts from other workers. Workers do not perform dominance actions until they are around 17 days old. Also, the emerging young B. petiolata's body sizes increase from January through March, which is the end of adult emergence. Since worker production extends until the end of January, workers arising this month were bigger in size than those born in the earlier part of the season, around November and December. Variations in reproductive capacity and body size of the female young are due to changes in the amount of food given to them when they were larvae.

Growth is a function of the worker to larvae ratio. The more workers there are, the more opportunities there are for larvae to be fed. In B. petiolata, this ratio increased during November and December. This is the time period when gynes were being reared, indicating that there are more workers available to give food to the young that will become a part of the highest caste and need the most nutrition. The amount of food given to larvae influences caste.
