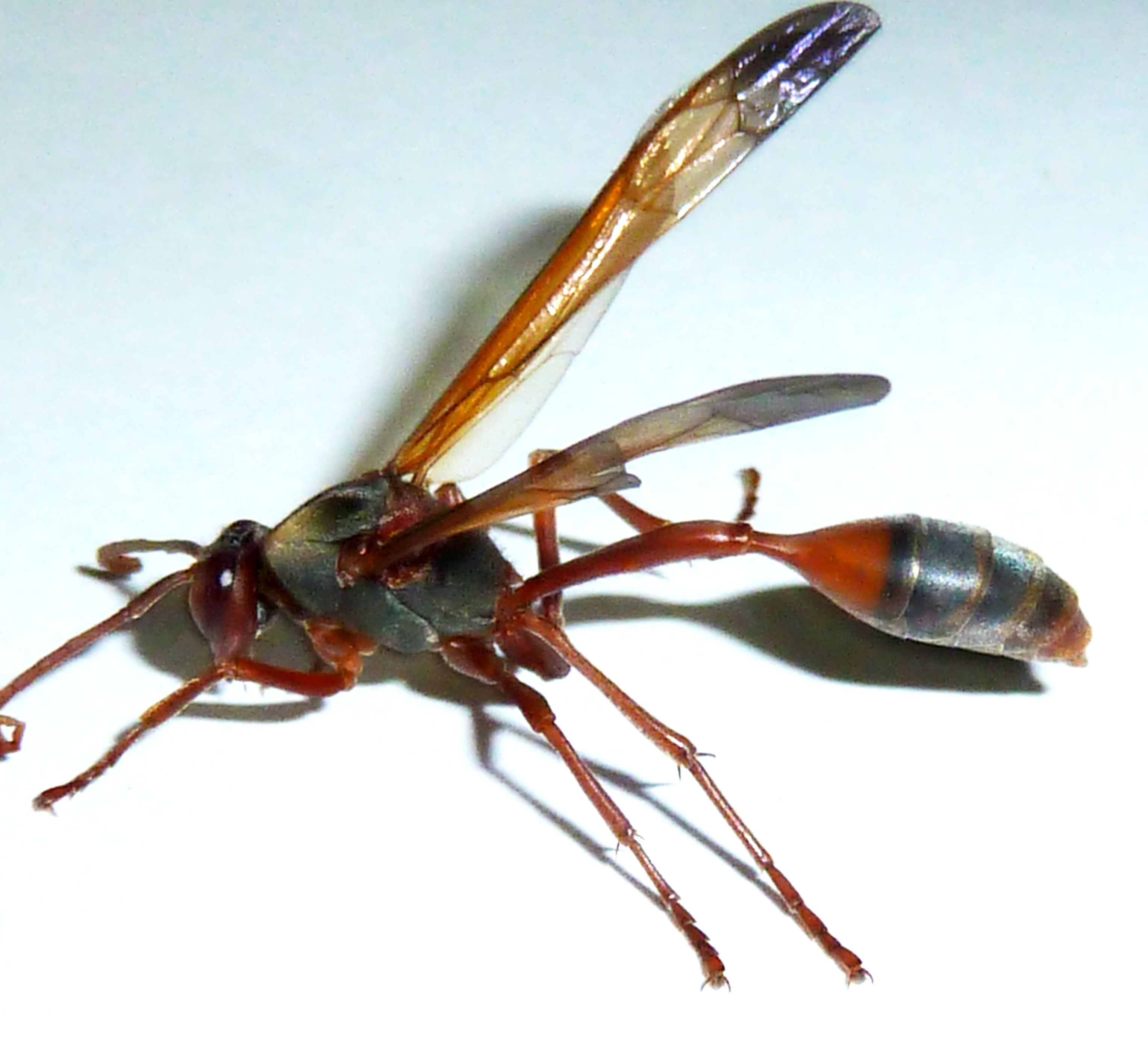
- B. j. colonialis, male

Scientific classification
- Kingdom: Animalia
- Phylum: Arthropoda
- Clade: Pancrustacea
- Class: Insecta
- Order: Hymenoptera
- Family: Vespidae
- Subfamily: Polistinae
- Tribe: Ropalidiini
- Genus: Belonogaster
- Species: B. juncea

Binomial name
- Belonogaster juncea (Fabricius, 1781)

Subspecies
- B. juncea colonialis; B. juncea juncea

= Belonogaster juncea =

Species of wasp

Belonogaster juncea is a typical quasisocial paper wasp from Sub-Saharan Africa and Southwest Asia. It is the type species for the genus Belonogaster.

== Breeding ==
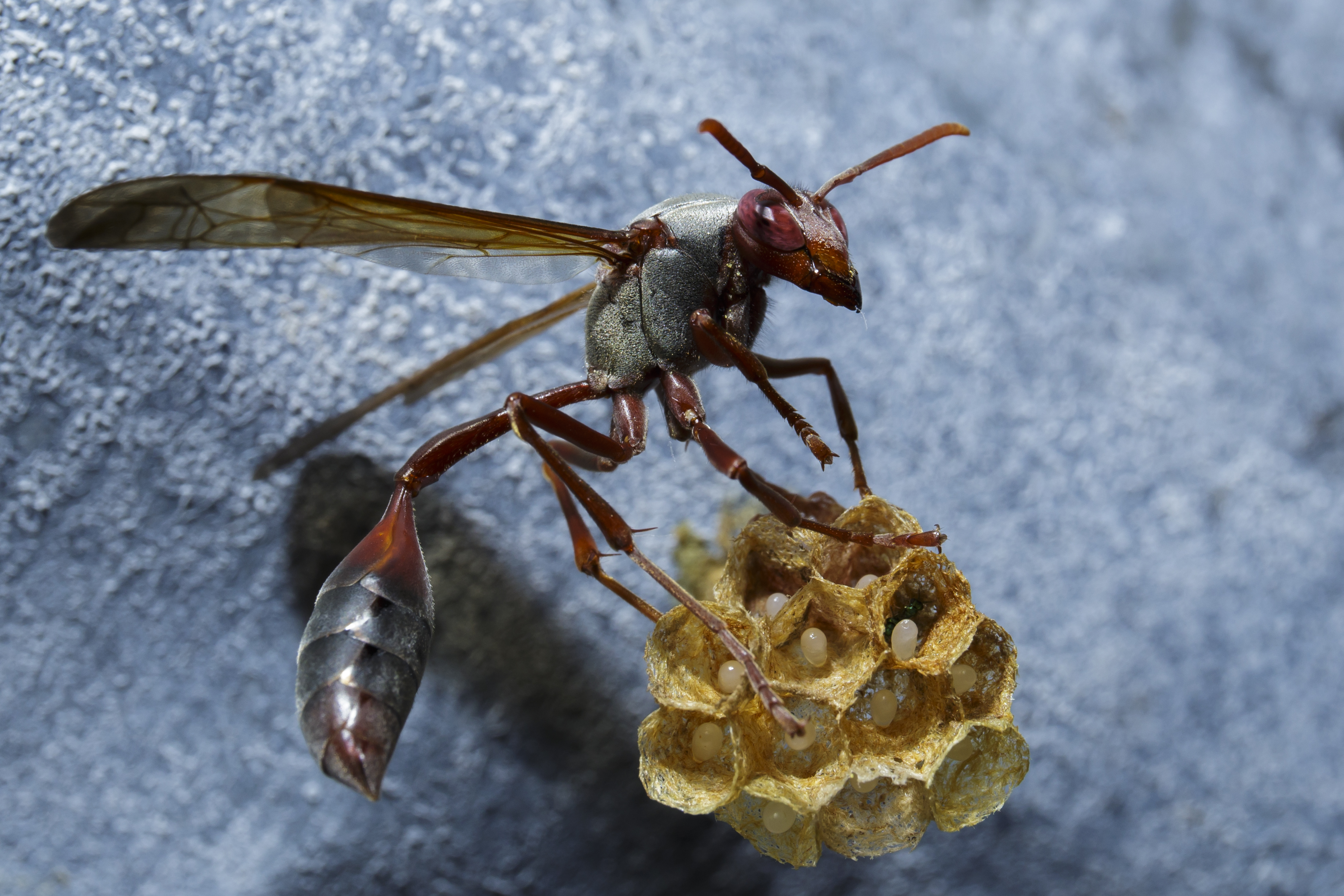
Belonogaster juncea at a nest

The nest is similar in form to that of the Polistes paper wasp's nest and is started in a similar way. However, as B. juncea is quasisocial no foundress wasp becomes a dominant queen and all foundresses are full egg-layers, as are any daughters which can mate with males and then join the nest working and laying alongside their mothers. In Cameroon, B. juncea juncea mostly nests in buildings, but nests nave been constructed in the shelter of large boulders. Nests were started throughout the year either by a single female or by groups of two to eight females. Predation and disease meant that only half of the colonies in one study produced at least one adult offspring, and only 10% were able to produce males from the 15% that managed to rear any sexual individuals.

== Queen succession ==
When the original foundress disappears the remaining females fight for dominance, leading to a reduction in breeding success. Almost half of the surviving nests are then abandoned and the average colony lasts about seven months. In a small minority of nests, some females remained on the nest and began a new colonial cycle illustrating semi-independence between colony and nesting cycles. The maximum number of successive cycles to be completed in the same nest was four. The queens of B. juncea therefore demonstrate serial polygyny.

== Behavioural roles ==
Studies of B. juncea have discerned four behavioural roles for individual adult wasps in a colony. Reproduction is reserved to one individual and the "workers"’ are divided into foragers, builders, and guards. The foragers are females that spend the majority of their time foraging to supply the nest with prey and water. Builders are individuals that will bring wood pulp to the nest and then use it to repair or expand the nest. Guards are those females that spend most of their time being inactive on the nest to defend it and its contents from threats.

== Distribution ==
It ranges through most of Africa south of the Sahara, from Senegal in the west to Ethiopia in East Africa and south to South Africa, including the island of Zanzibar. It also occurs in Asia as far east as India.

== Subspecies ==
There are two subspecies described.

- Belonogaster juncea colonialis Kohl, 1894
- Belonogaster juncea juncea (Fabricius, 1781)
