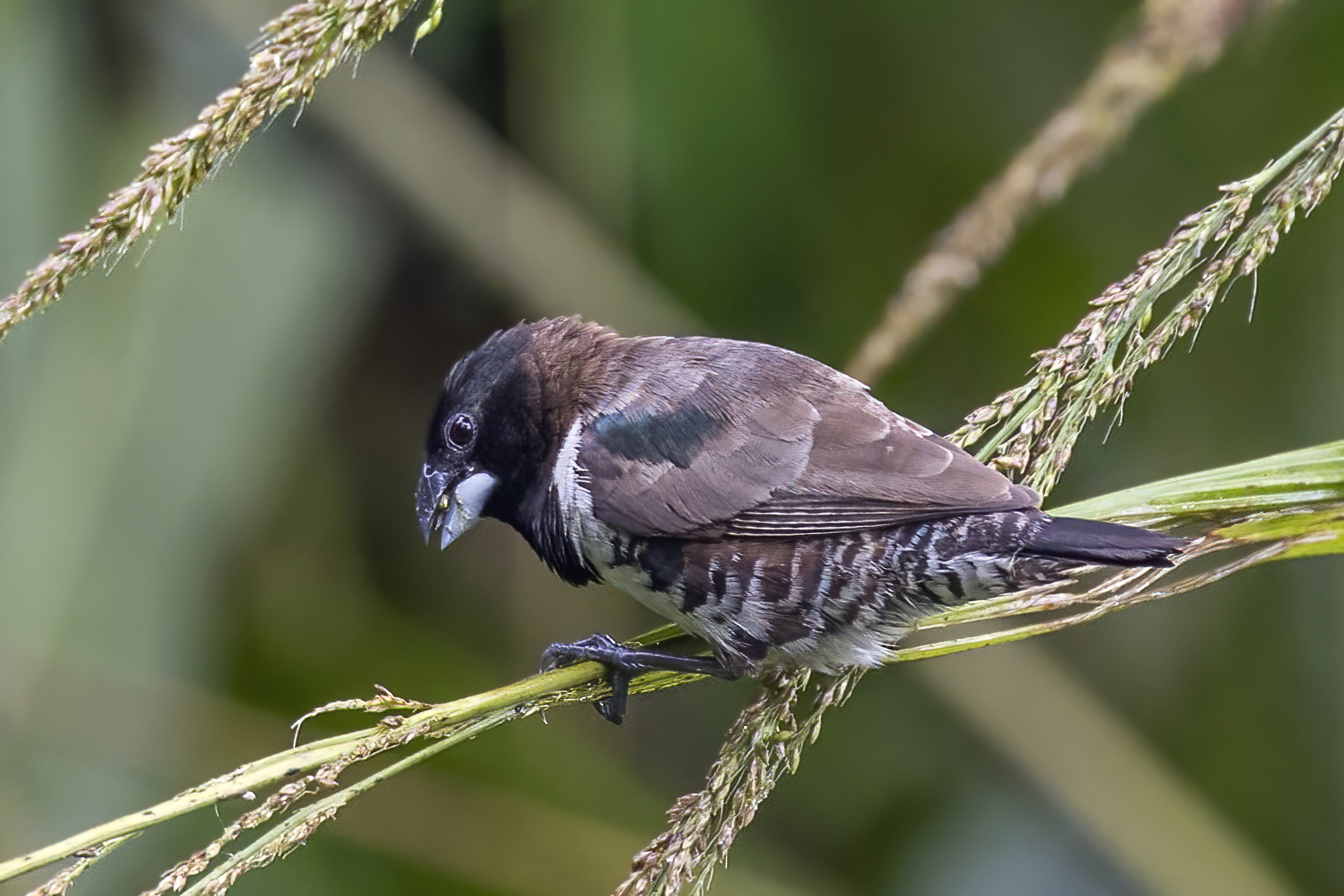
- S. c. subsp. cucullata, São Tomé and Príncipe
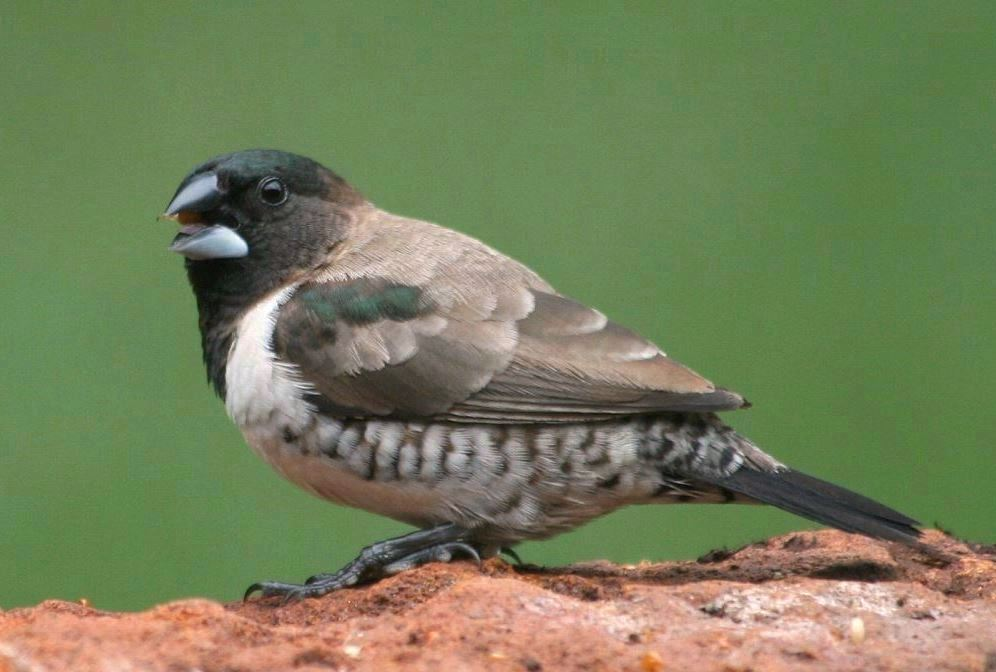
- S. c. subsp. scutata in South Africa

Conservation status
- Least Concern (IUCN 3.1)

Scientific classification
- Kingdom: Animalia
- Phylum: Chordata
- Class: Aves
- Order: Passeriformes
- Family: Estrildidae
- Genus: Spermestes
- Species: S. cucullata

Binomial name
- Spermestes cucullata Swainson, 1837
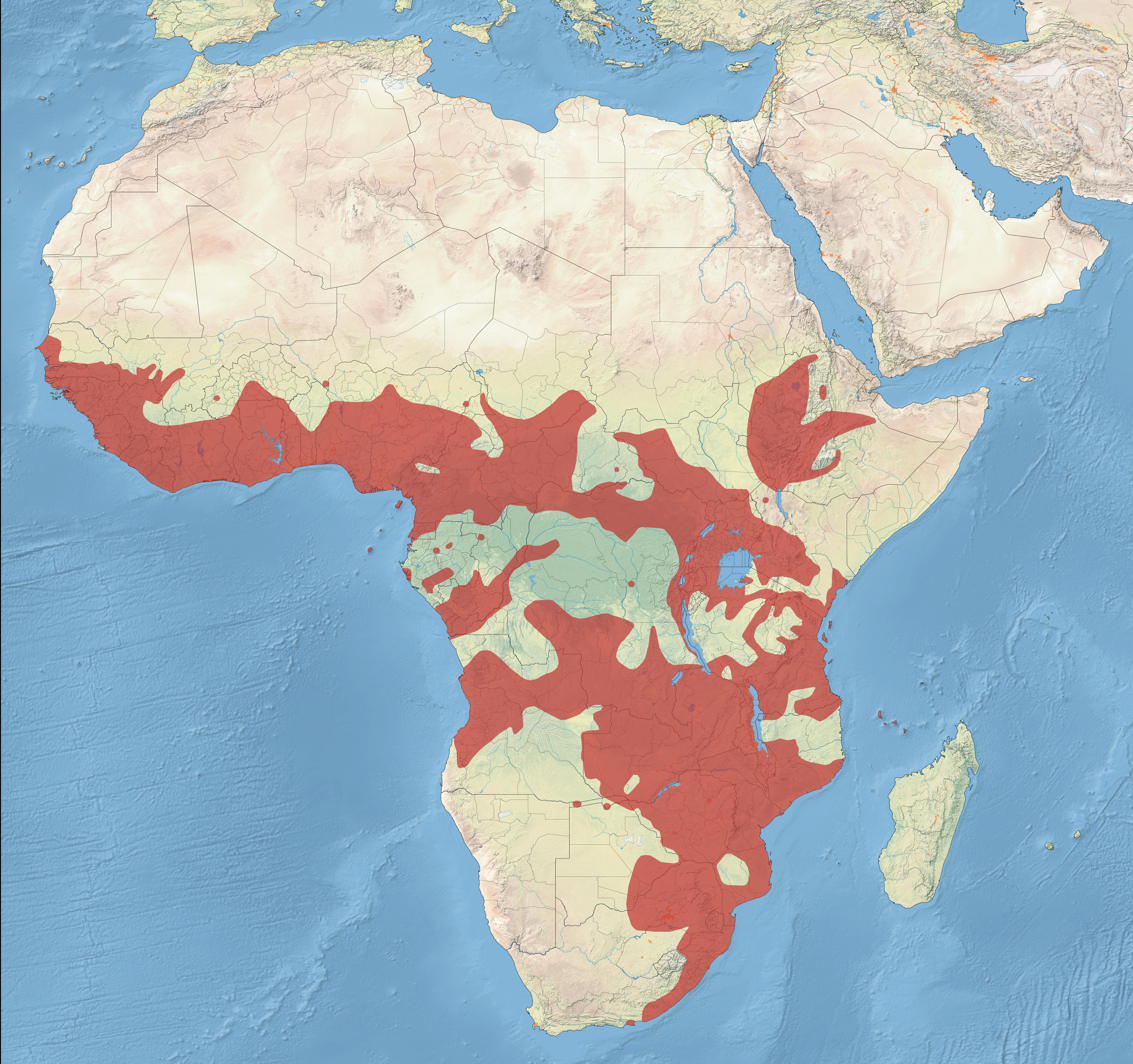
- distribution

Synonyms
- Lonchura cucullata (Swainson, 1837); Spermestes scutatus Heuglin, 1863

= Bronze mannikin =

Species of bird

The bronze mannikin or bronze munia (Spermestes cucullata) is a small passerine (i.e. perching) bird of the Afrotropics. This very social estrildid finch is an uncommon to locally abundant bird in much of Africa south of the Sahara Desert, where it is resident, nomadic or irruptive in mesic savanna or forest margin habitats. It has an estimated global extent of occurrence of 23,600,000 km^{2} (9,100,000 sq mi). It is the smallest and most widespread of four munia species on the African mainland, the other being black-and-white, red-backed and magpie mannikin. It co-occurs with the Madagascar mannikin on the Comoro Islands, and was introduced to Puerto Rico. Especially in the West Africa, it is considered a pest in grain and rice fields. It is locally trapped for the pet bird trade.

== Taxonomy ==
S.c. subsp. scutata in Zanzibar

The bronze mannikin was formally described in 1837 by the English naturalist William Swainson and given the binomial name Spermestes cucullata. The specific epithet is from Late Latin cucullatus meaning "hooded". The type locality is Senegal.

Two subspecies are recognised:

- S. c. cucullata Swainson, 1837 – Senegal and Gambia to south Sudan, Uganda, west Kenya and the island of Bioko
- S. c. scutata Heuglin, 1863 – Ethiopia and east Kenya to southeast South Africa, east Angola and Comoro Islands

== Description ==
Measurements
Length	♂	87–92 mm (3.4–3.6 in)
	♀	85–88 mm (3.3–3.5 in)
Culmen	♂	9–10 mm (0.4–0.4 in)
	♀	8–9 mm (0.3–0.4 in)
Wing	♂	48–50 mm (1.9–2.0 in)
Tail	♂	30–35 mm (1.2–1.4 in)
Tarsus	♂	10–11 mm (0.4–0.4 in)
	♀	10 mm (0.39 in)

The bronze mannikin is one of the smallest munia species, measuring 9–10 cm in length and weighing 7–12 grams. The adult is a compact bird with a short black tail, and stubby black and pale grey (not distinctly bluish) mandibles. It is black to brownish black on the head, chin, throat and center of the chest, with some purple-green iridescence on the face and sides of the breast. It has greyish brown upper parts and white underparts with irregular barring on the flanks and rump. A small green iridescent patch is present on the outer scapular feathers, besides, especially in the western race, the sides of the lower breast. Wing coverts and remiges are bordered in a paler or warmer tone. The sexes are similar. Immature birds are dun brown above with buff head and underpart plumage. They moult into full adult plumage by age six months, when the males also begin to sing and exhibit breeding behaviour. The race S. c. scutata has barred rather than bronzy green plumage at the junction of the lower breast and flanks. Rump and upper tail feathers only finely barred and almost uniformly dark. These characters are however somewhat variable and unpredictable.

This species has a number of calls including a rreep-rreeep in flight, a twittering when perched, consisting of various wheezy or buzzing notes. The song is a concatenated and somewhat repetitive series of notes.

== Distribution and habitat ==
The bronze mannikin is native to mainland Africa and the Bioko, Pemba, Zanzibar, Mafia and Comoro islands, and has been introduced to Puerto Rico, where it is established. The two accepted races have an extensive region around the upper Nile River which is inhabited by birds with intermediate features. A proposed third race, S. c. subsp. tressellata Clancey, 1964 is not generally recognized.

== Behaviour and ecology ==
The bronze mannikin is a tiny gregarious bird which feeds mainly on seeds, including wild grass seeds, millet, rice and grain. Alternatively termites, nectar or strands of algae may also be eaten. Before going to roost at nightfall, they usually visit a watering hole where vegetation is hanging into the water. They roost at night in ball-shaped nests, which in the non-breeding season are built solely for this purpose. These slovenly communal roosting nests are dismantled (for reuse of material) and rebuilt almost daily at the same or a new location, in a communal effort. Each party, numbering 8 to 20 birds, seems to be dominated by a single adult male. The flock defends the immediate vicinity of a nest against intruders, but newcomers to a flock are easily accepted. They may associate with waxbill or other mannikin species, and may also use their vacated nests. Pairs often allopreen.

=== Breeding ===
They are incessant nest builders that may raise up to four broods a year, given favourable circumstances. The nest is a large domed grass structure in a tree, into which 4 to 8 small, white eggs are laid. Incubation takes 12 days, and chicks fledge after three weeks, and are independent in another three weeks. The chicks are reared on soft green seeds and insects.

== Images ==
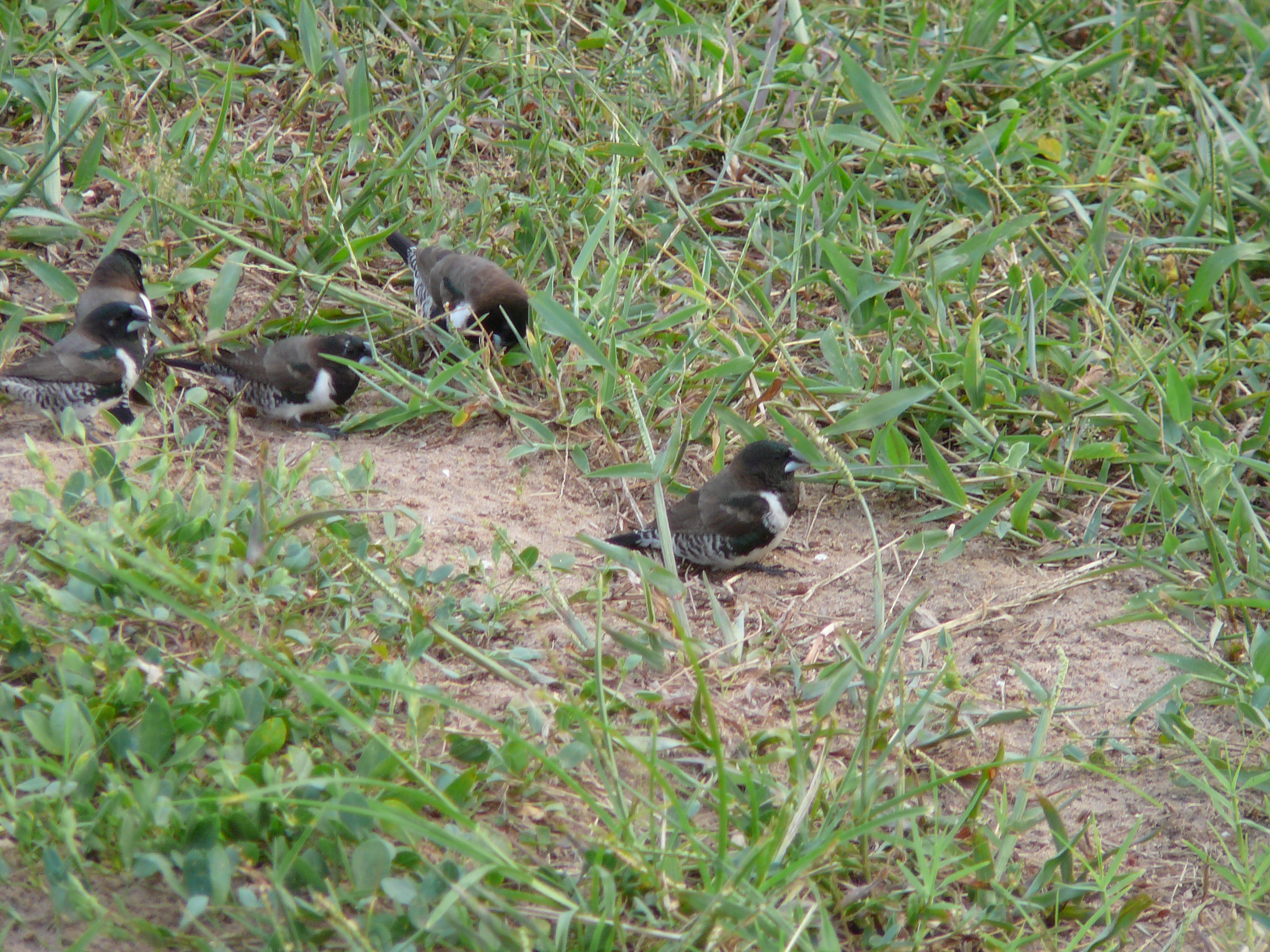
A party of bronze mannikins foraging on the ground. Alarm notes of a sentry bird will warn of approaching danger

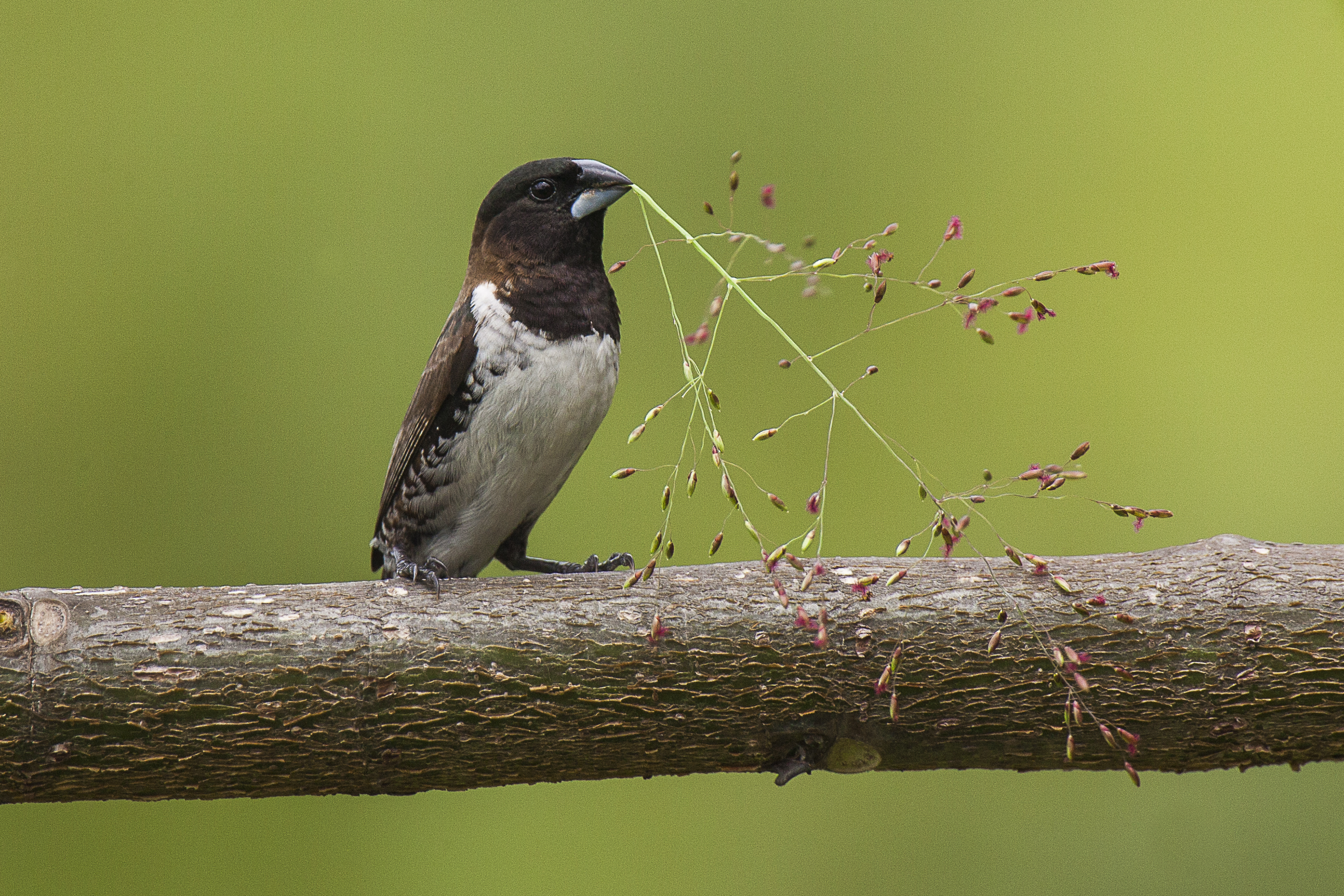
An adult bronze mannikin in Uganda carries the seed head of green Guinea grass for nest-building. Green Digitaria and Sporobolus grasses are also used.

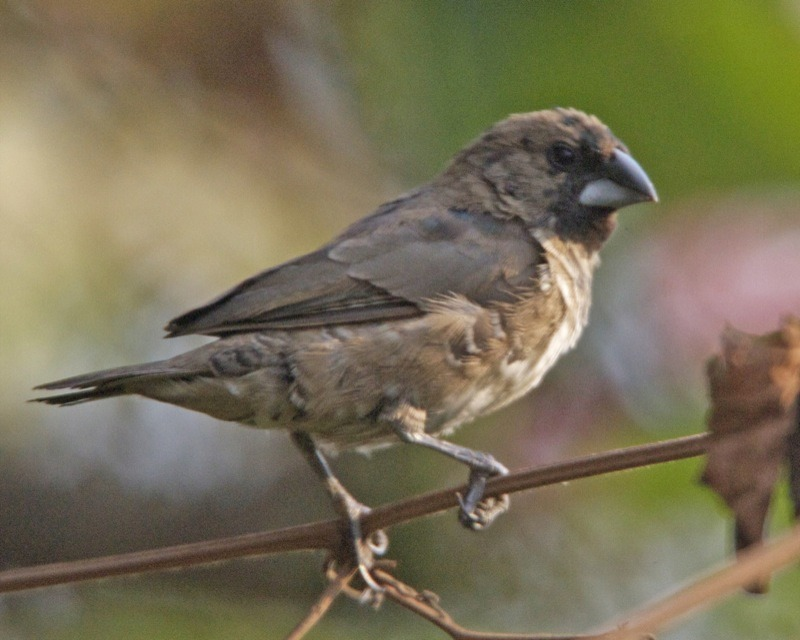
Immature bird

Flock of bronze mannikins perched together, Zanzibar
