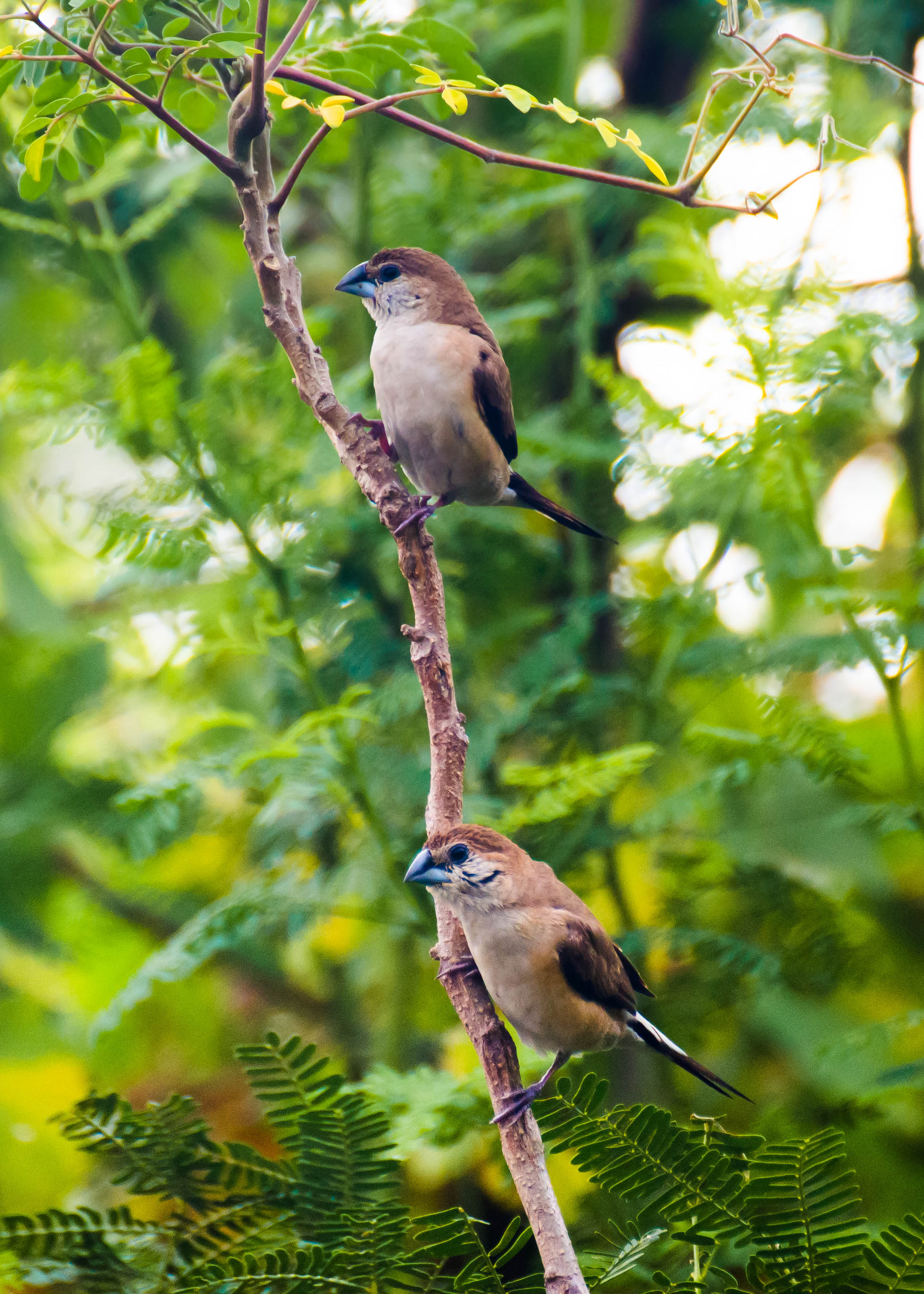
- Indian silverbill (Euodice malabarica)

Scientific classification
- Kingdom: Animalia
- Phylum: Chordata
- Class: Aves
- Order: Passeriformes
- Family: Estrildidae
- Genus: Euodice; Reichenbach, 1862

Type species
- Loxia cantans African silverbill Gmelin, 1789

Species
- See text.

= Euodice =

Genus of birds

Euodice is a genus of small seed-eating birds in the family Estrildidae. These species are from the dry zones of Africa and India and are commonly referred to as silverbills. They were formerly included in the genus Lonchura.

The grey-headed silverbill, which shares the name "silverbill", is a member of the same family but is placed in the genus Spermestes.

== Taxonomy ==
The genus Euodice was introduced in 1862 by the German naturalist Ludwig Reichenbach. The name combines the Ancient Greek eu meaning "good" with ōdikos meaning "musical" or "singing". The type species was designated as the African silverbill in 1890 by Richard Bowdler Sharpe.

The Indian and Africa silverbills were formerly placed in the genus Lonchura. A molecular phylogenetic study published in 2020 found that these species formed a clade that was basal to the members of Lonchura.

=== Species ===
The genus contains the following two species:

Genus Euodice – Reichenbach, 1862 – two species
Common name	Scientific name and subspecies	Range	Size and ecology	IUCN status and estimated population
African silverbill	Euodice cantans (Gmelin, JF, 1789) Two subspecies: E. c. cantans (Gmelin, JF, 1789); E. c. orientalis (Lorenz von Liburnau, L & Hellmayr, 1901)	Central Africa	Size: Habitat: Diet:	LC
Indian silverbill	Euodice malabarica (Linnaeus, 1758)	Indian Subcontinent and adjoining regions	Size: Habitat: Diet:	LC
