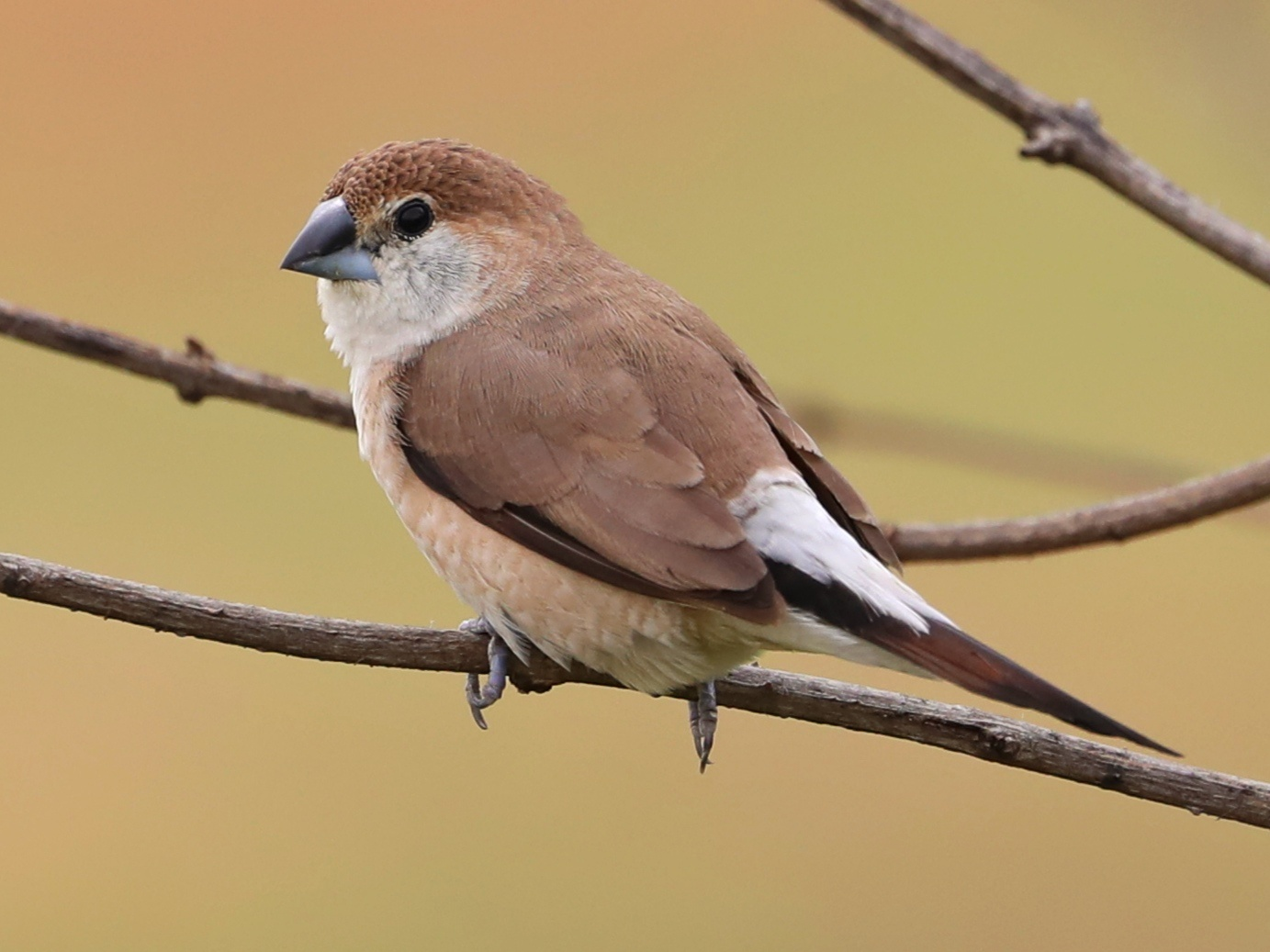

Conservation status
- Least Concern (IUCN 3.1)

Scientific classification
- Kingdom: Animalia
- Phylum: Chordata
- Class: Aves
- Order: Passeriformes
- Family: Estrildidae
- Genus: Euodice
- Species: E. malabarica

Binomial name
- Euodice malabarica (Linnaeus, 1758)

Synonyms
- Loxia malabarica Linnaeus, 1758; Lonchura malabarica (Linnaeus, 1758)

= Indian silverbill =

Species of bird

The Indian silverbill or white-throated munia (Euodice malabarica) is a small passerine bird found in the Indian subcontinent and adjoining regions that was formerly considered to include the closely related African silverbill (Euodice cantans). This estrildid finch is a common resident breeding bird in the drier regions of the Middle East and the Indian subcontinent. It has also been introduced into many other parts of the world and has become established in some areas. They forage in small flocks in grassland and scrub habitats.

== Taxonomy ==
The Indian silverbill was formally described by the Swedish naturalist Carl Linnaeus in 1758 in the tenth edition of his Systema Naturae. He placed the species with the crossbills in the genus Loxia and coined the binomial name Loxia malabarica. The specific epithet is from the Malabar region on the southwestern coast of India. Linnaeus specified the locality as India but this was restricted to the Malabar region by E. C. Stuart Baker in 1926. The Indian silverbill is now placed with the African silverbill in the genus Euodice that was introduced by Ludwig Reichenbach in 1862. The species is monotypic: no subspecies are recognised.

The Indian and Africa silverbills were formerly placed in the genus Lonchura. A molecular phylogenetic study published in 2020 found that these two silverbills formed a clade that was basal to the members of Lonchura.

== Description ==
The adult Indian silverbill is 11–11.5 cm long and has a conical silver-grey bill, buff-brown upperparts, white underparts, buffy flanks and dark wings. The tail is black and the wings are dark contrasting with a white rump. The sexes are similar, but immatures have buff underparts and a shorter tail. The tail appears pointed as the length of the feathers reduces from the centre outwards. It feeds mainly on seeds, but also takes insects and has been known to visit nectar bearing flowers, such as those of Erythrina trees.

== Habitat and distribution ==
It frequents dry open scrub, fallow land and cultivation, sometimes near water. Although mainly found on the plains, they can be found up to about 1200 m in some sub-Himalayan regions. It occurs in Pakistan, Nepal, Bangladesh, India, Sri Lanka, Iran and Israel. It has been accidentally introduced into many other parts of the world and has established itself in Jordan, Israel, Kuwait, Oman, Puerto Rico, Qatar, Saudi Arabia, Egypt since 2019, United States, Virgin Islands (possibly extinct) and Nice (southern France).

Although largely sedentary, some populations make seasonal movements.

== Behaviour and ecology ==
These birds are gregarious and are found in flocks of as many as 60 birds. They feed on the ground or on low shrubs and grass stalks. They constantly utter a low cheeping or chirping contact call as they forage. They visit water and drink with a rapid sip and swallow action. Their feed on a wide range of grass seeds and will also make use of crop species. The breeding season is spread out and varies with region. They nest in winter in southern India and after summer in northern India. The nest, an untidy ball of grasses with an opening on the side, is placed in low shrubs, often on thorny Acacia. They are also known to make use of the old nests of baya weaver sometimes even visiting those that are occupied by the weaver birds. They will sometimes build their nest below the platform nests of vultures or storks. Old nests are used as dormitories through the year for roosting. Females are known to lay their eggs in the nests of other pairs. The clutch varies from 4 to 8 white eggs and these are incubated by both parents for about 11 days. Helpers may be involved in breeding as more than a pair are sometimes seen at a nest.

Several parasitic protozoans and coccidia (Sivatoshella lonchurae) have been described from the species.

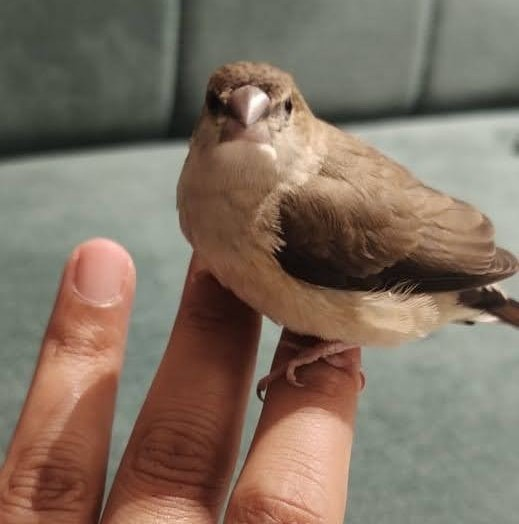
Indian Silverbill at Home

== Gallery ==
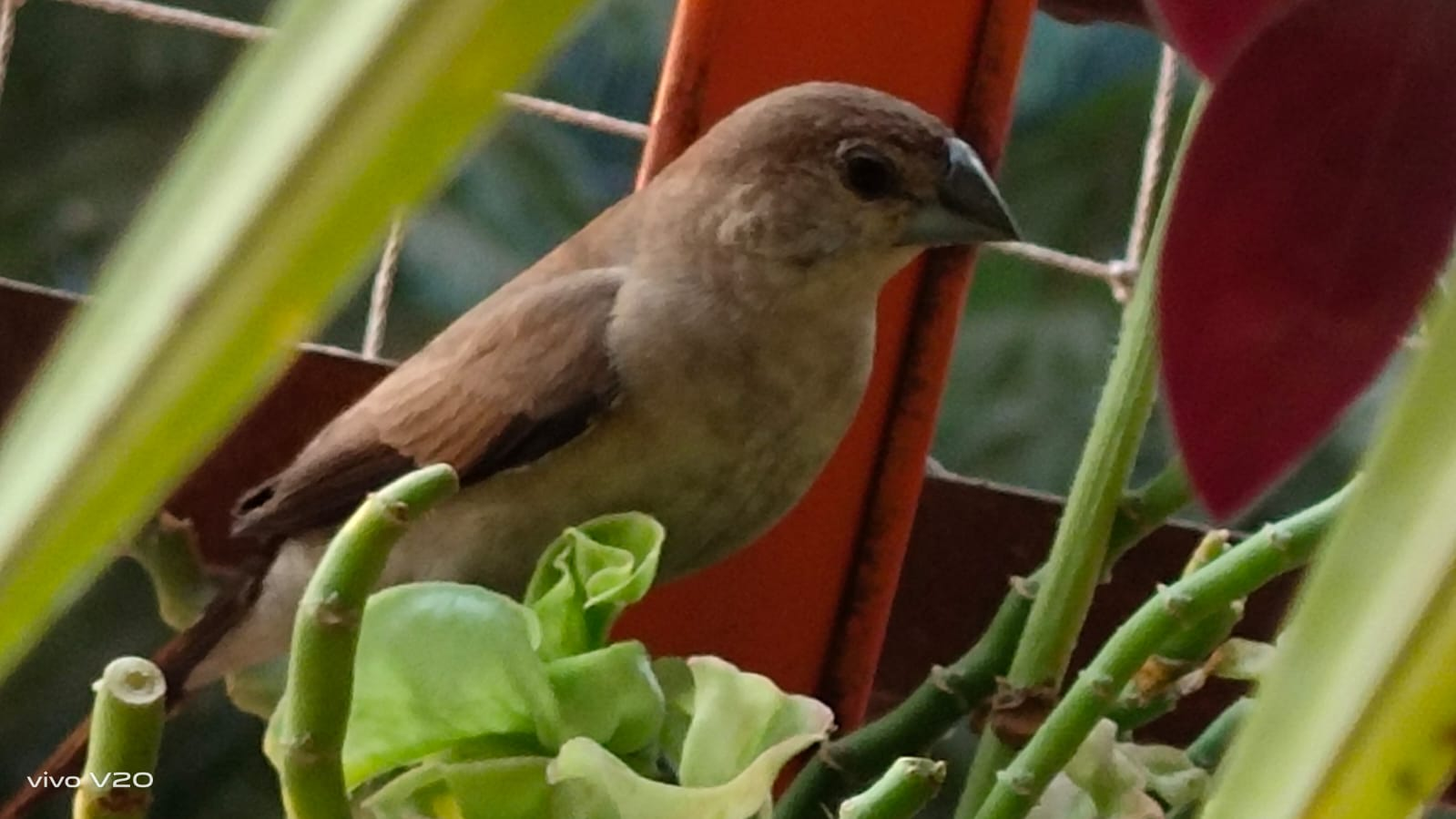
Silverbill Sitting in plant

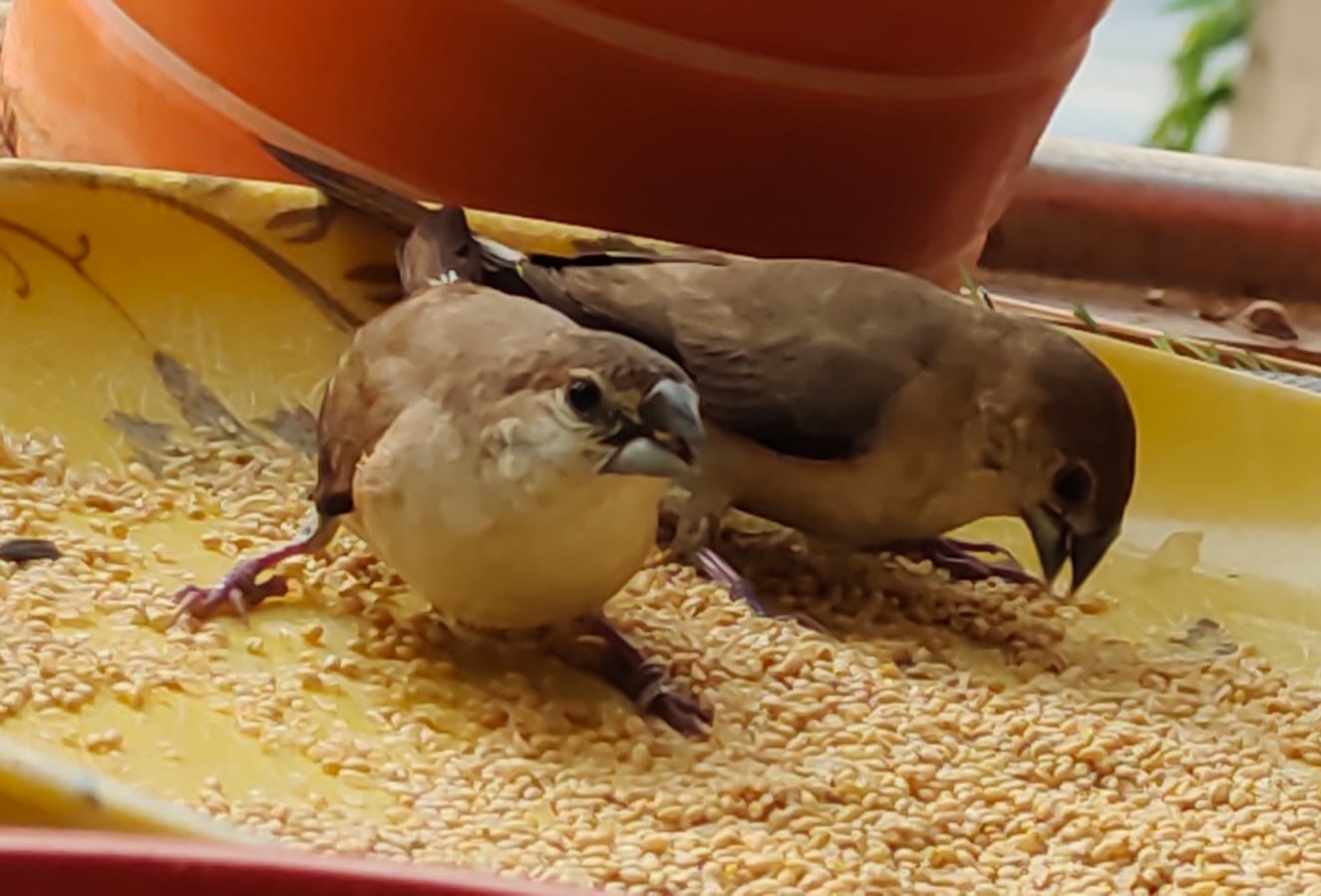
Siverbill watching at me

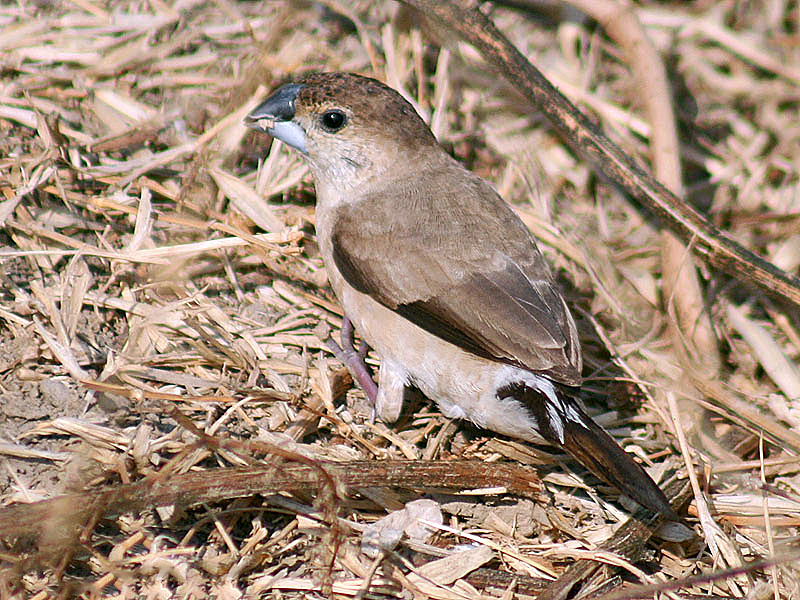
Foraging on the ground (India)

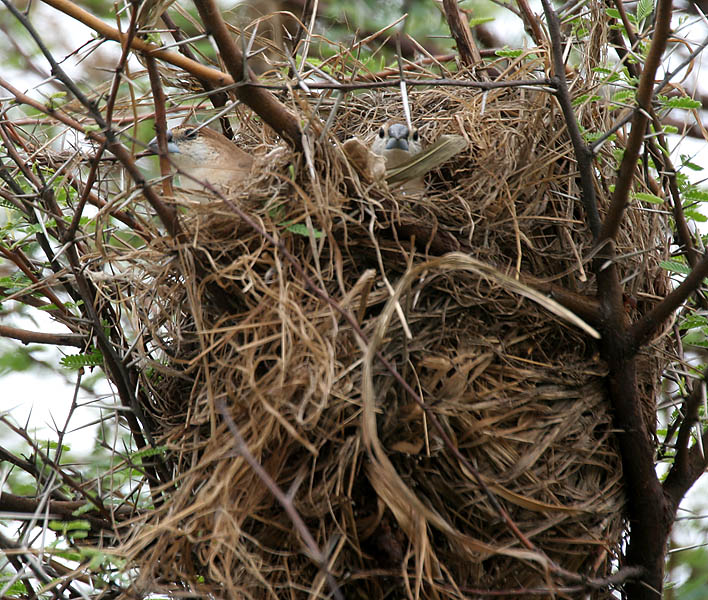
Nest in a thorny Acacia

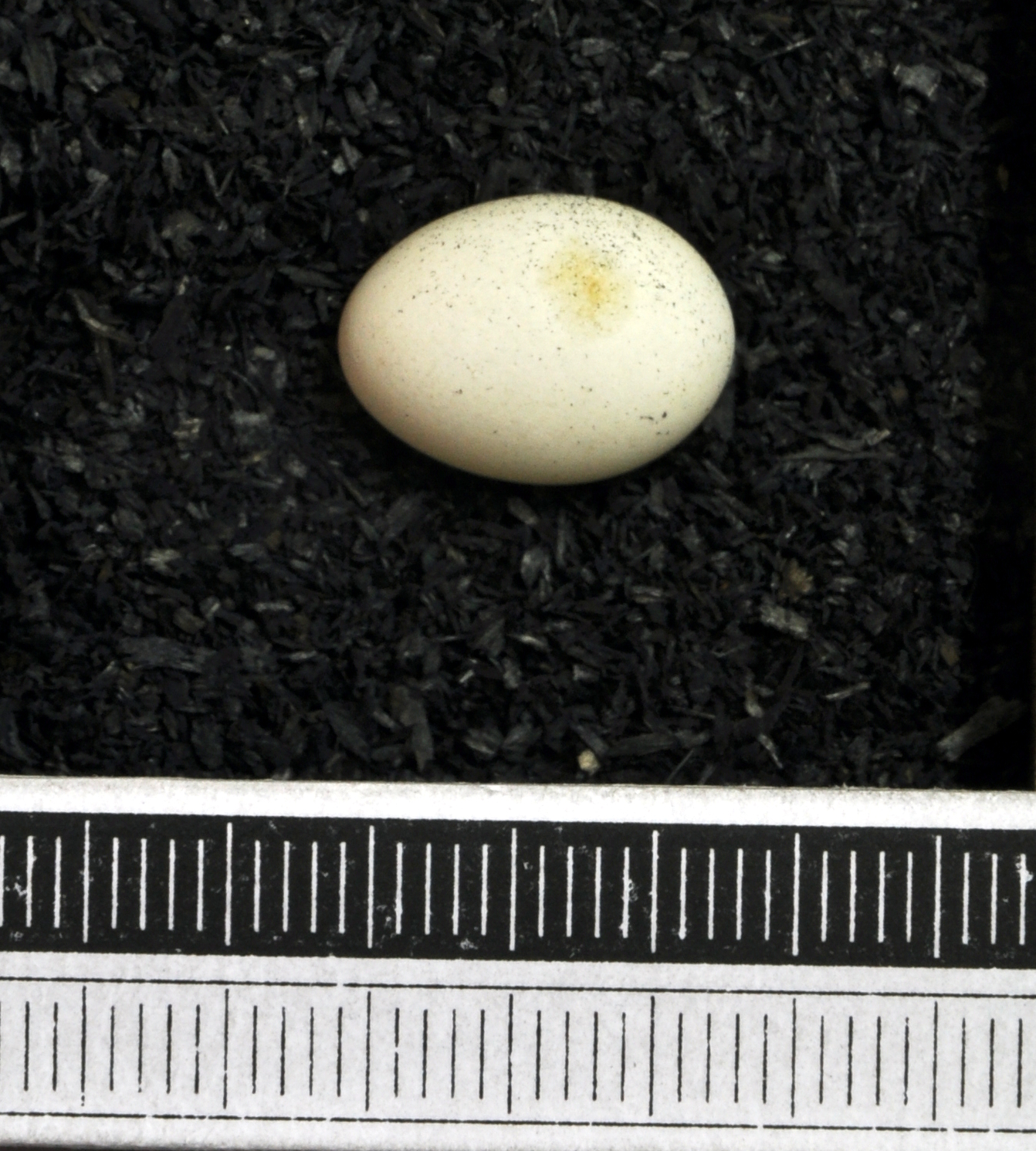
Egg (Museum Wiesbaden)

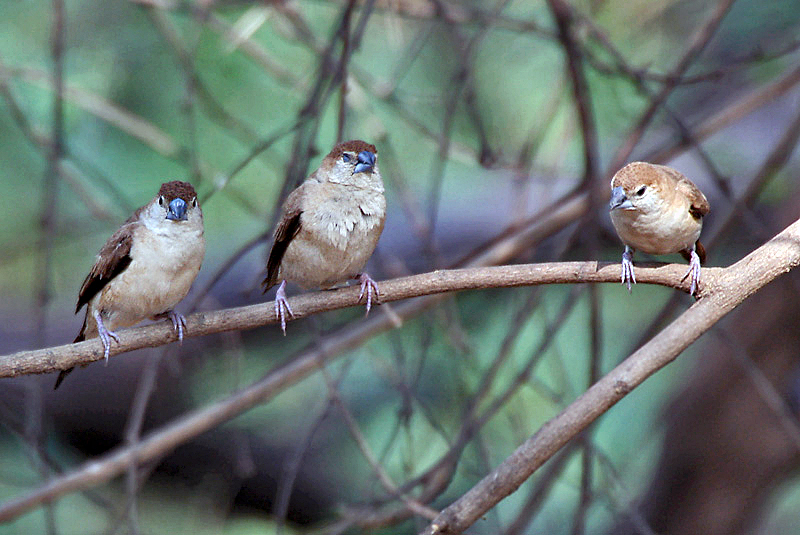
Part of a flock, with an immature

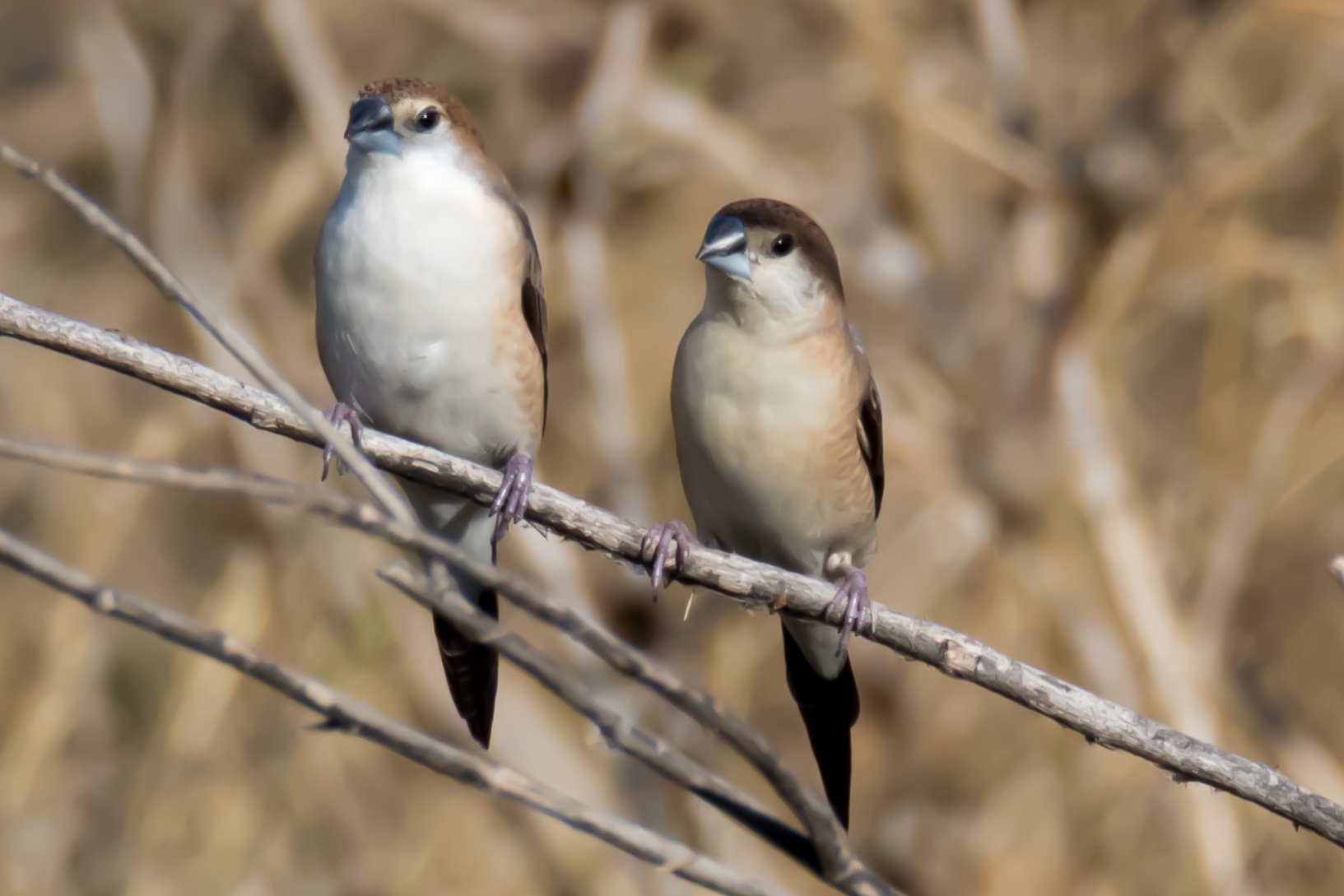
Indian Silverbill (South India)

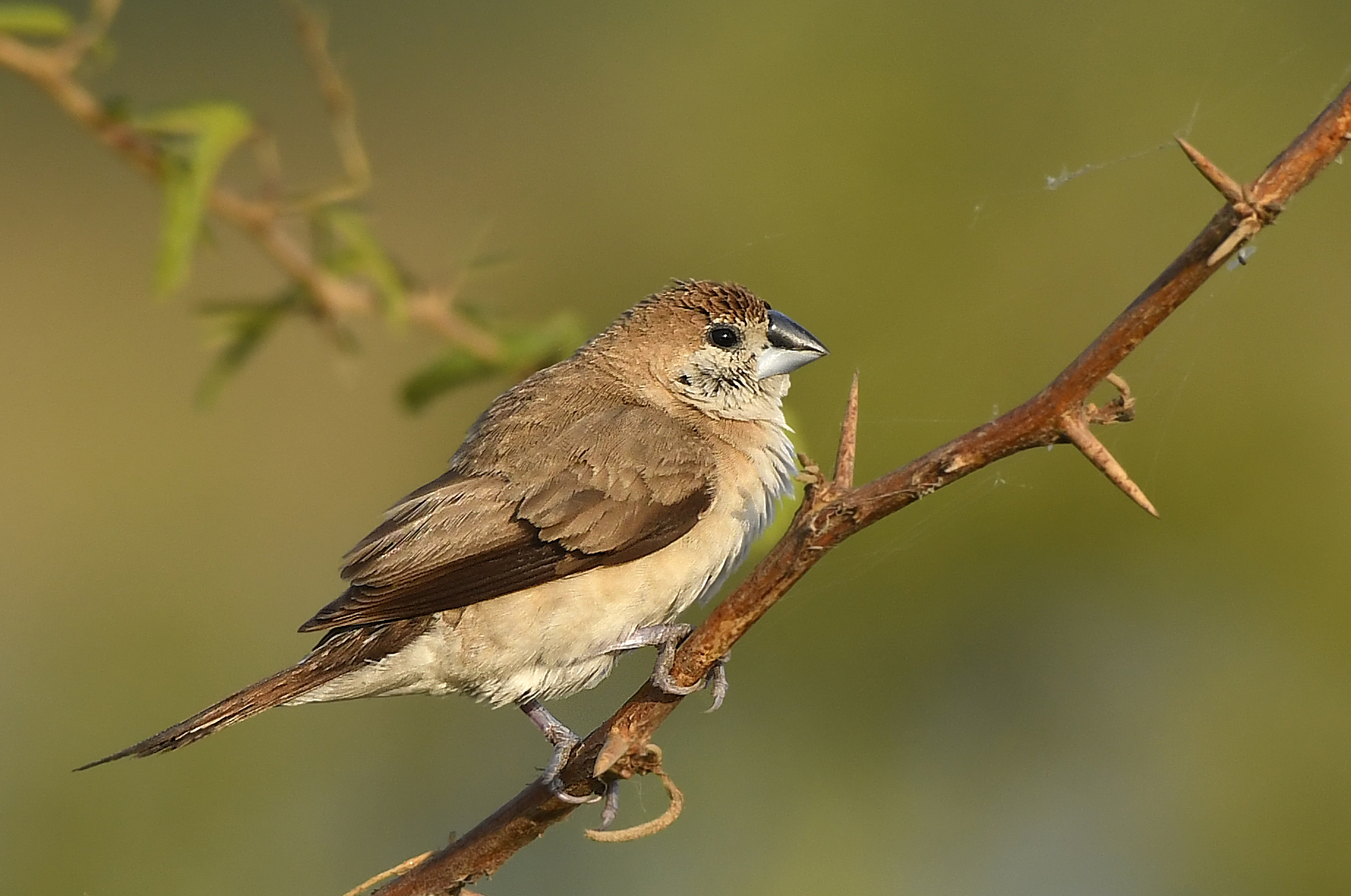
Indian Silverbill at Khijadiya Bird Sanctuary, Jamnagar, India
