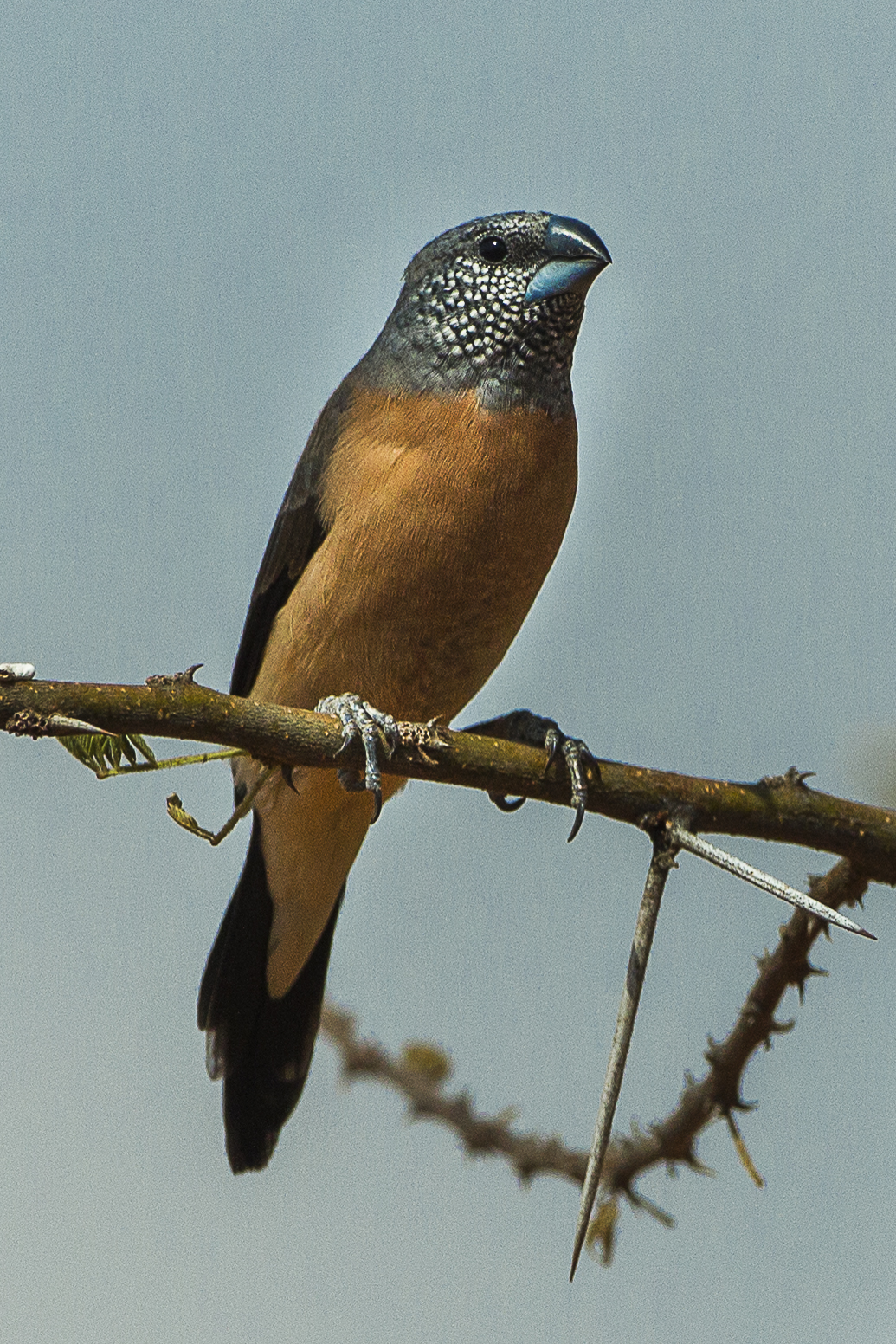

Conservation status
- Least Concern (IUCN 3.1)

Scientific classification
- Kingdom: Animalia
- Phylum: Chordata
- Class: Aves
- Order: Passeriformes
- Family: Estrildidae
- Genus: Spermestes
- Species: S. griseicapilla

Binomial name
- Spermestes griseicapilla (Delacour, 1943)

Synonyms
- Odontospiza griseicapilla Lonchura griseicapilla

= Grey-headed silverbill =

Species of bird

The grey-headed silverbill (Spermestes griseicapilla), also known as pearl-headed mannikin, is a species of estrildid finch found in eastern Africa, Ethiopia, Kenya, South Sudan, and Tanzania. It has an estimated global extent of occurrence of 400,000 km^{2} (150,000 sq mi). It was formerly usually placed in the monotypic genus Odontospiza as Odontospiza caniceps and sometimes placed in the genus Lonchura.

== Description ==
The grey-headed silverbill is a stocky bird with a grey head studded with white dots. Its body is greyish-brown with partly black wings and tail and a white rump. The juvenile can be told by its white rump. Adult male is approximately 11.5 cm (4.5 in) in length with wing length 6.5 cm (2.6 in).

== Habitat ==
The grey-headed silverbill is commonly found in dry savanna habitat but never too far away from water. It wanders widely, influenced by weather and shifting availability of sources of water.

== Behavior and ecology ==
The grey-headed silverbill is gregarious, moving in small flocks and often mixing with African silverbill.

=== Food and feeding ===
The grey-headed silverbill feeds mostly on grass seeds. But it has been suggested that the species also feed on insects which are more a source of moisture than dry seeds.
