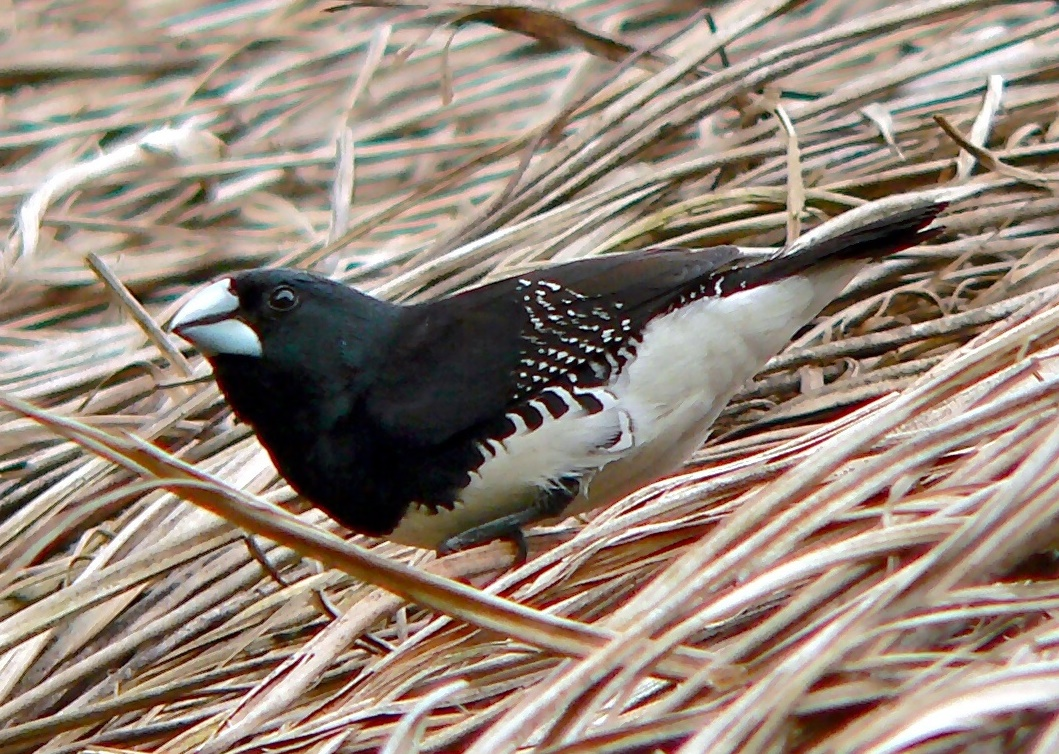
- In Douala, Cameroon
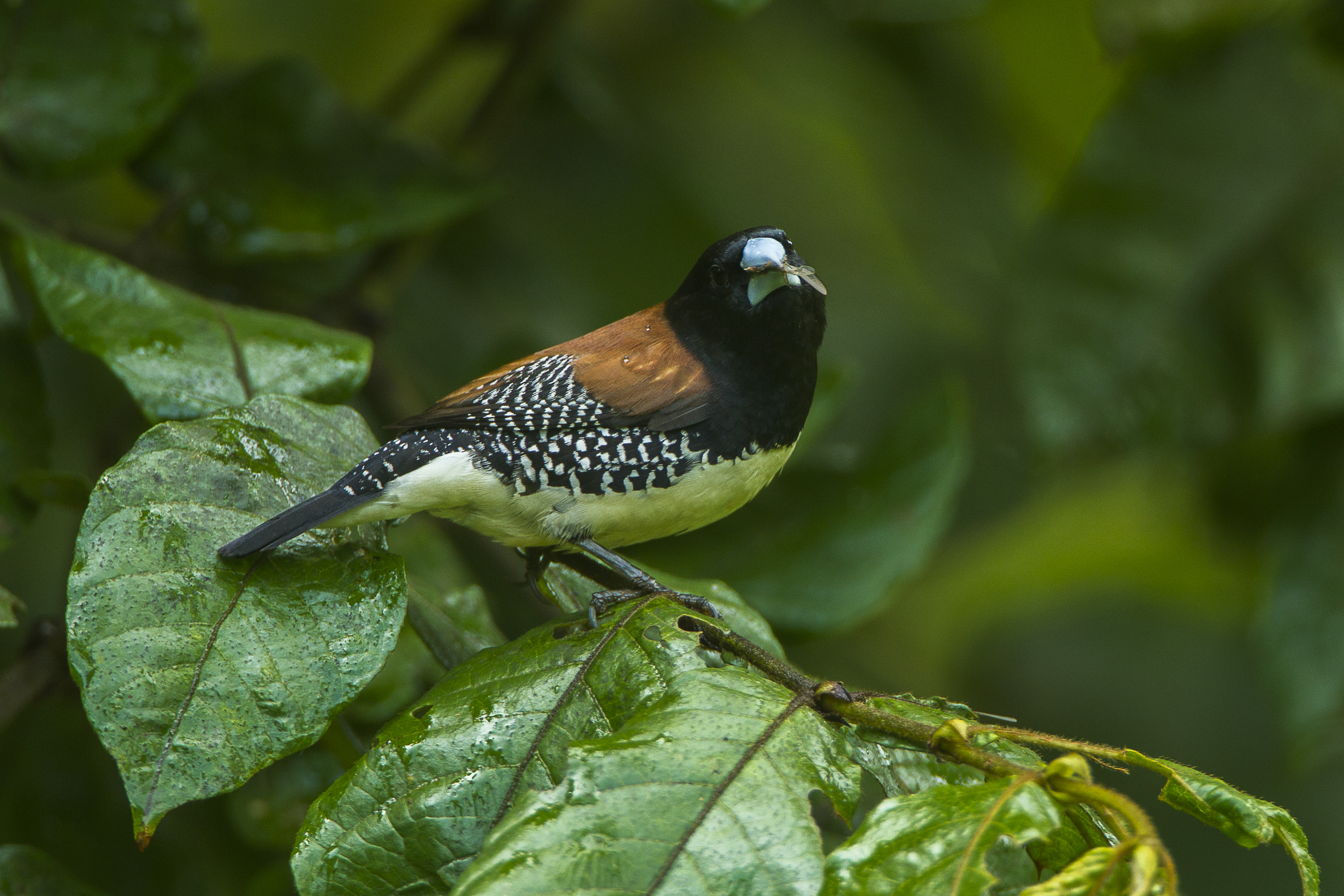
- Subspecies S. b. nigriceps in Kenya

Conservation status
- Least Concern (IUCN 3.1)

Scientific classification
- Kingdom: Animalia
- Phylum: Chordata
- Class: Aves
- Order: Passeriformes
- Family: Estrildidae
- Genus: Spermestes
- Species: S. bicolor

Binomial name
- Spermestes bicolor (Fraser, 1843)

= Black-and-white mannikin =

Species of bird

The black-and-white mannikin (Spermestes bicolor) also black-and-white munia or red-backed mannikin, is a species of estrildid finch, widely present throughout sub-Saharan Africa. It has an estimated global extent of occurrence of 4,200,000 km^{2} (1,600,000 sq mi). It is found in moist savanna and subtropical or tropical moist lowland forest habitat. The status of the species is evaluated as least concern. They are seedeaters, but are known to feed on algae.

The black-and-white mannikin was formally described in 1843 by the British zoologist and collector Louis Fraser from a specimen collected near Cape Palmas in Liberia. He placed the species in the genus Amadina and coined the binomial name Amadina bicolor. The black-and-white mannikin is now one of the four species placed in the genus Spermestes that was introduced in 1837 by William Swainson.

Four subspecies are recognised:

- S. b. bicolor (Fraser, 1843) – Guinea-Bissau to Cameroon
- S. b. poensis (Fraser, 1843) – south Cameroon to south Sudan, southwest Ethiopia, west Kenya and the island of Bioko
- S. b. woltersi (Schouteden, 1956) – southeast DR Congo and northwest Zambia
- S. b. nigriceps Cassin, 1852 – central Kenya and south Somalia to east Angola, Zambia, Zimbabwe and east South Africa

The subspecies S. b. woltersi and S. b. nigriceps have sometimes been considered as a separate species, the red-backed mannikin.
