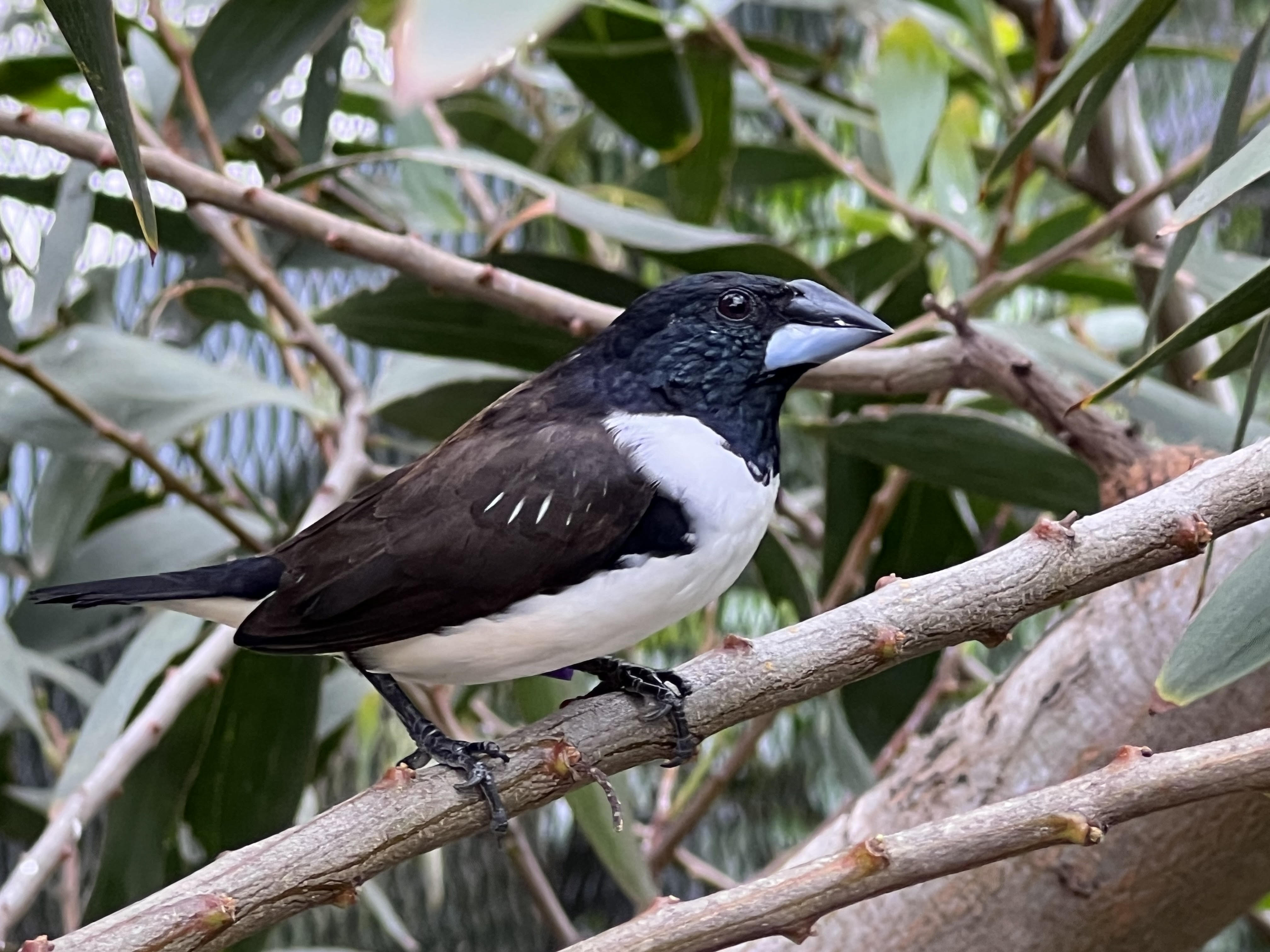

Conservation status
- Least Concern (IUCN 3.1)

Scientific classification
- Kingdom: Animalia
- Phylum: Chordata
- Class: Aves
- Order: Passeriformes
- Family: Estrildidae
- Genus: Spermestes
- Species: S. fringilloides

Binomial name
- Spermestes fringilloides (Lafresnaye, 1835)

= Magpie mannikin =

Species of bird

The magpie mannikin or magpie munia (Spermestes fringilloides) is a species of estrildid finch, sparsely present across Sub-Saharan Africa. It has an estimated global extent of occurrence of 1,400,000 km^{2}.

It is found in subtropical/ tropical (lowland) moist shrubland, forest and dry grassland habitat. The status of the species is evaluated as Least Concern.

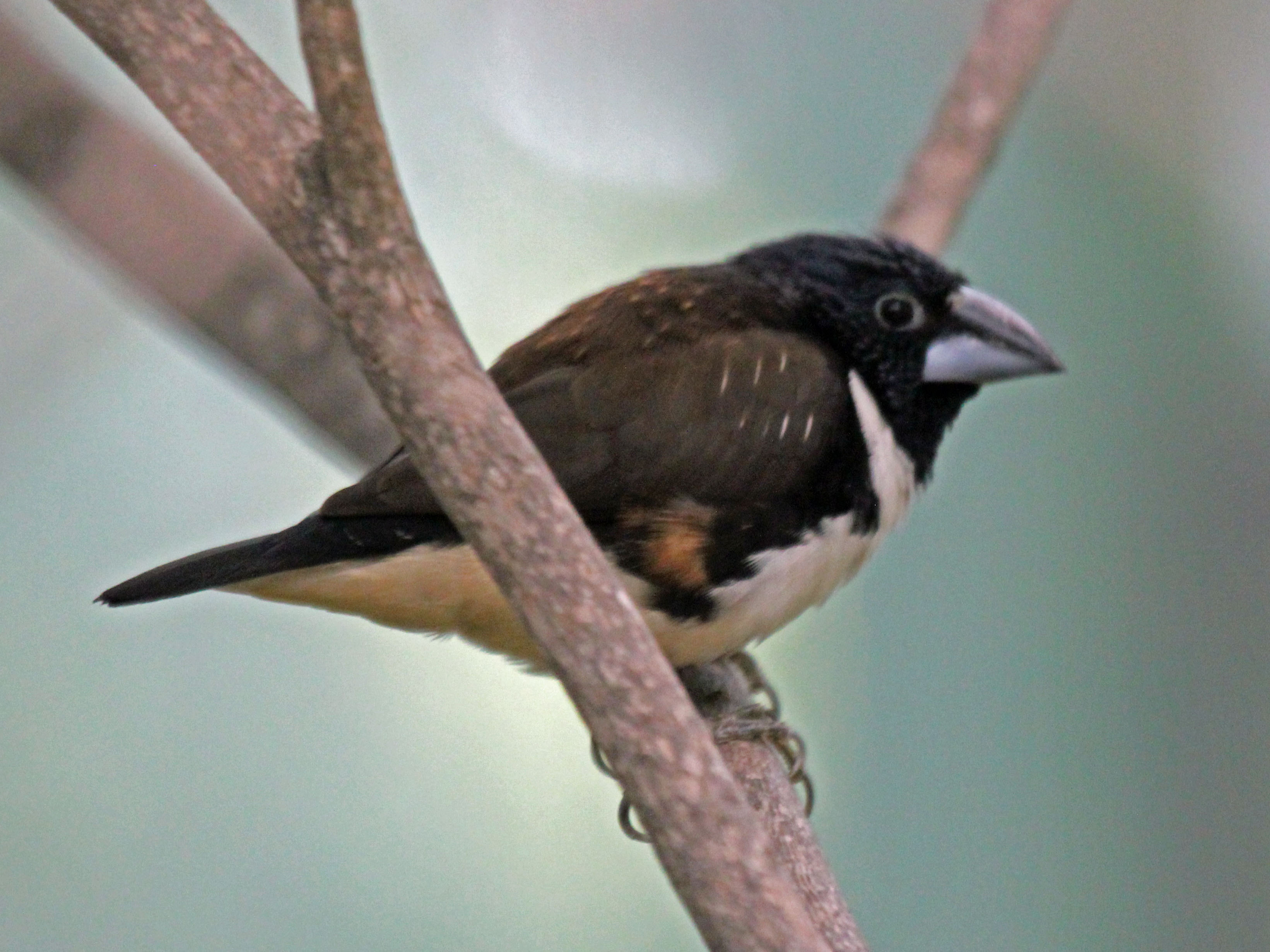
At San Diego Zoo
