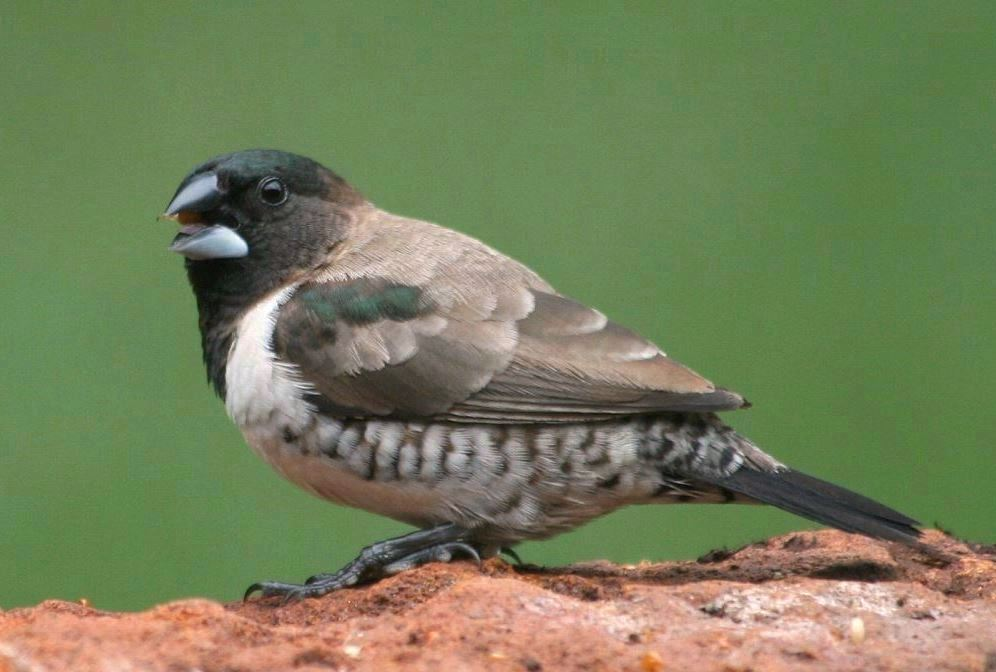
- Bronze mannikin (Spermestes cucullata)

Scientific classification
- Kingdom: Animalia
- Phylum: Chordata
- Class: Aves
- Order: Passeriformes
- Family: Estrildidae
- Genus: Spermestes; Swainson, 1837

Type species
- Spermestes cucullata bronze mannikin Swainson, 1837

Species
- See text

= Spermestes =

Genus of birds

Spermestes is a genus of small seed-eating birds in the family Estrildidae. They are distributed across Sub-Saharan Africa.

== Taxonomy ==
The genus Spermestes was introduced in 1837 by the English naturalist William Swainson to accommodate the bronze mannikin. The name combines the Ancient Greek sperma meaning "seed" and -estēs meaning "-eater".

Based on the results of a molecular phylogenetic study published in 2020, this genus was resurrected for a clade of species that were formerly assigned to the genera Lonchura and Odontospiza.

=== Species ===
The genus contains the following four species:

Genus Spermestes – Swainson, 1837 – four species
Common name	Scientific name and subspecies	Range	Size and ecology	IUCN status and estimated population
Grey-headed silverbill	Spermestes griseicapilla (Delacour, 1943)	eastern Africa	Size: Habitat: Diet:	LC
Bronze mannikin	Spermestes cucullata Swainson, 1837 Two subspecies: S. c. cucullata Swainson, 1837; S. c. scutata Heuglin, 1863	Africa south of the Sahara Desert	Size: Habitat: Diet:	LC
Magpie mannikin	Spermestes fringilloides (Lafresnaye, 1835)	Sub-Saharan Africa	Size: Habitat: Diet:	LC
Black-and-white mannikin	Spermestes bicolor (Fraser, 1843) Four subspecies: S. b. bicolor (Fraser, 1843); S. b. poensis (Fraser, 1843); S. b. woltersi (Schouteden, 1956); S. b. nigriceps Cassin, 1852	African tropical rainforest	Size: Habitat: Diet:	LC
